= Globe =

Scale model of a celestial body

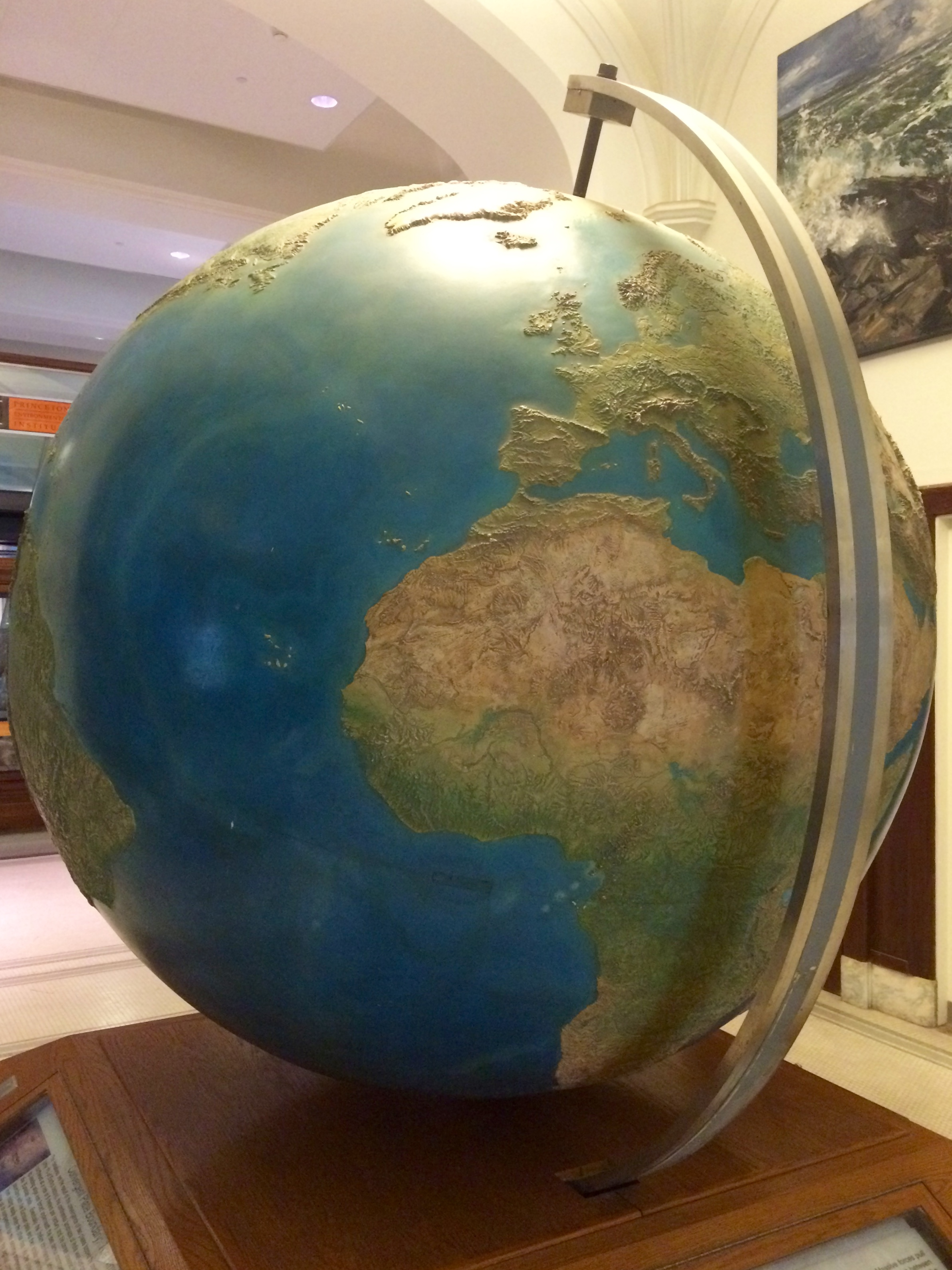
Topography globe featuring physical features of the Earth

A globe is a spherical model of Earth, of some other celestial body, or of the celestial sphere. Globes serve purposes similar to maps, but, unlike maps, they do not distort the surface that they portray except to scale it down. A model globe of Earth is called a terrestrial globe. A model globe of the celestial sphere is called a celestial globe.

A globe shows details of its subject. A terrestrial globe shows landmasses and water bodies. It might show nations and major cities and the network of latitude and longitude lines. Some have raised relief to show mountains and other large landforms. A celestial globe shows notable stars, and may also show positions of other prominent astronomical objects. Typically, it will also divide the celestial sphere into constellations.

The word globe comes from the Latin word globus, meaning "sphere". Globes have a long history. The first known mention of a globe is from Strabo, describing the Globe of Crates from about 150 BC. The oldest surviving terrestrial globe is the Erdapfel, made by Martin Behaim in 1492. The oldest surviving celestial globe sits atop the Farnese Atlas, carved in the 2nd century Roman Empire.

== Terrestrial and planetary ==
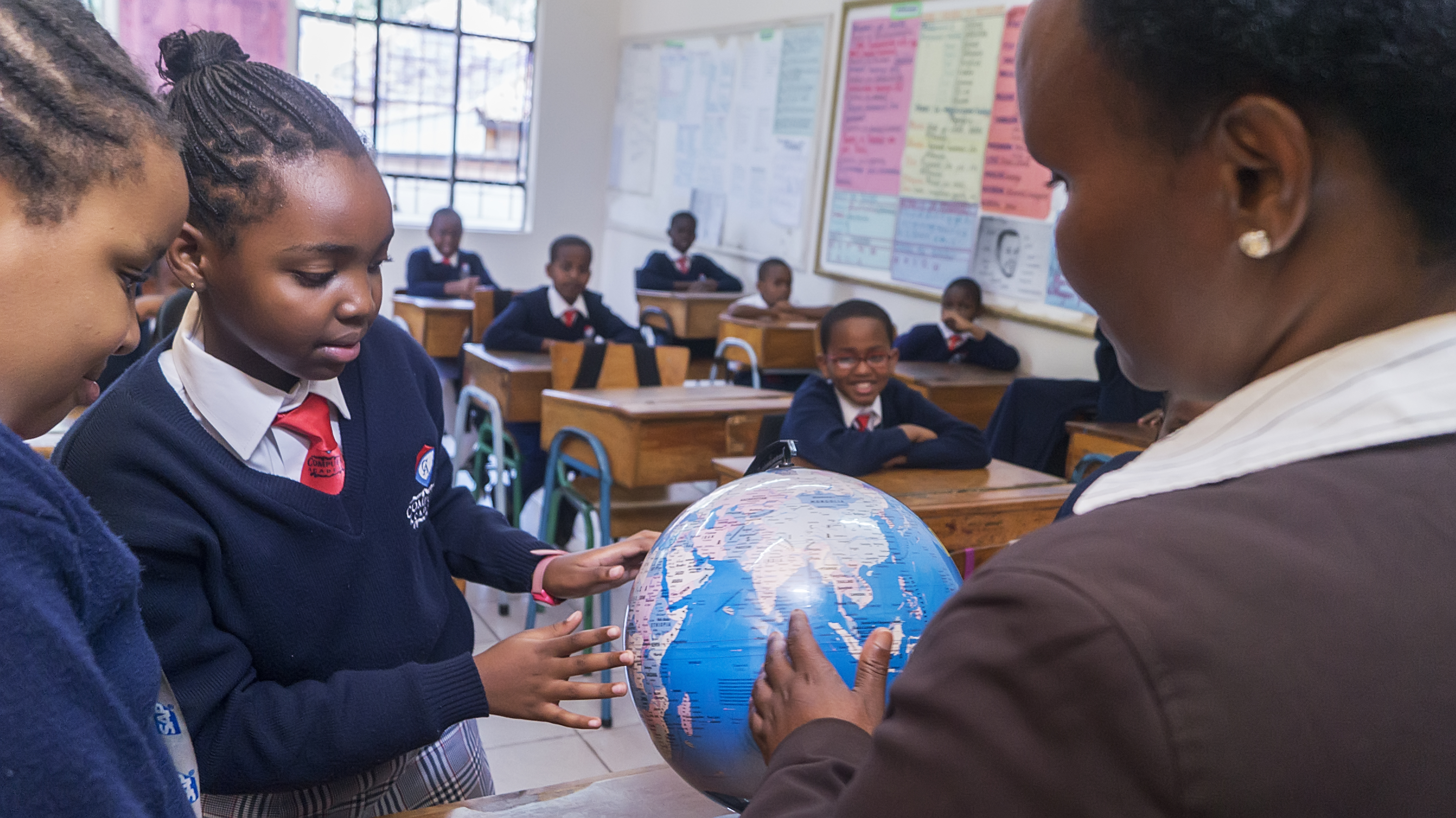
Students and teacher looking at a terrestrial globe of the earth.

Flat maps are created using a map projection that inevitably introduces an increasing amount of distortion the larger the area that the map shows. A globe is the only representation of the Earth that does not distort either the shape or the size of large features – land masses, bodies of water, etc.

The Earth's circumference is quite close to 40 million metres. Many globes are made with a circumference of one metre, so they are models of the Earth at a scale of 1:40 million. In imperial units, many globes are made with a diameter of one foot (about 30 cm), yielding a circumference of 3.14 feet (about 96 cm) and a scale of 1:42 million. Globes are also made in many other sizes.

Some globes have surface texture showing topography or bathymetry. In these, elevations and depressions are purposely exaggerated, as they otherwise would be hardly visible. For example, one manufacturer produces a three dimensional raised relief globe with a 64 cm (25 in) diameter (equivalent to a 200 cm circumference, or approximately a scale of 1:20 million) showing the highest mountains as over 2.5 cm (1 in) tall, which is about 57 times higher than the correct scale of Mount Everest.

Most modern globes are also imprinted with parallels and meridians, so that one can tell the approximate coordinates of a specific location. Globes may also show the boundaries of countries and their names.

Many terrestrial globes have one celestial feature marked on them: a diagram called the analemma, which shows the apparent motion of the Sun in the sky during a year.

Globes generally show north at the top, but many globes allow the axis to be swiveled so that southern portions can be viewed conveniently. This capability also permits exploring the Earth from different orientations to help counter the north-up bias caused by conventional map presentation.

== Celestial ==
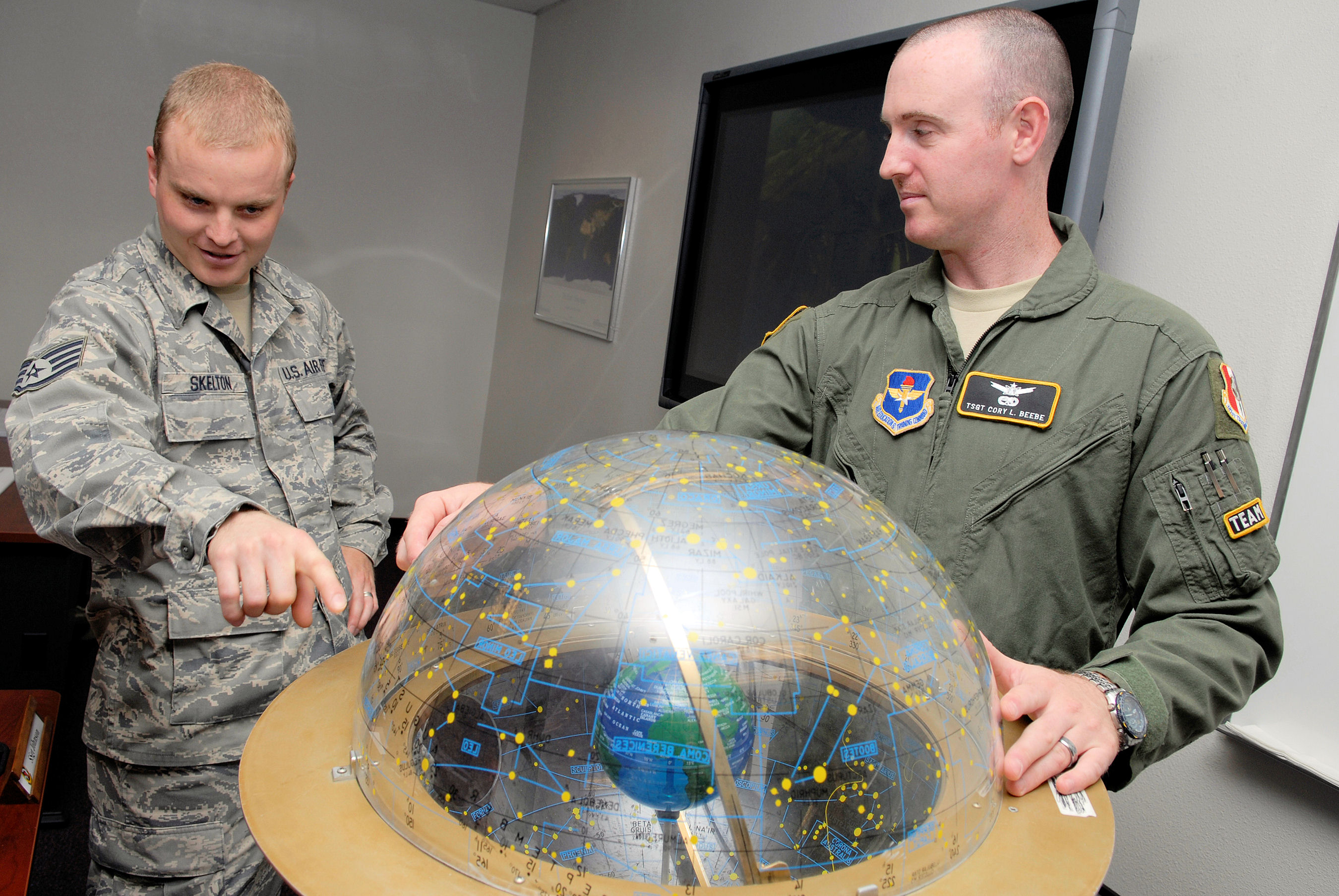
Trainer using a celestial sphere to show student a point used to see the apparent path the sun takes through the stars.

Celestial globes depict star positions while excluding the Sun, Moon, and planets due to their variable locations, though they mark the ecliptic—the Sun's apparent path. A structural challenge arises from the difference between Earth's perspective (a gnomonic projection from the celestial sphere's center) and the globe's external orthographic projection, which reverses constellations. Transparent globes introduce distortions when viewed externally, whereas opaque versions with reversed constellations and text are designed for mirror reflection to restore correct orientation.

Historically, celestial globes reflected geocentric models, such as Ptolemy's 2nd-century system using epicycles and equants to explain planetary motion. Medieval astronomers, influenced by his work, constructed globes to model star arrangements under the assumption of a static Earth encircled by rotating celestial spheres. This framework persisted until Copernicus proposed a heliocentric system, redefining humanity's understanding of cosmic structure.

== History ==
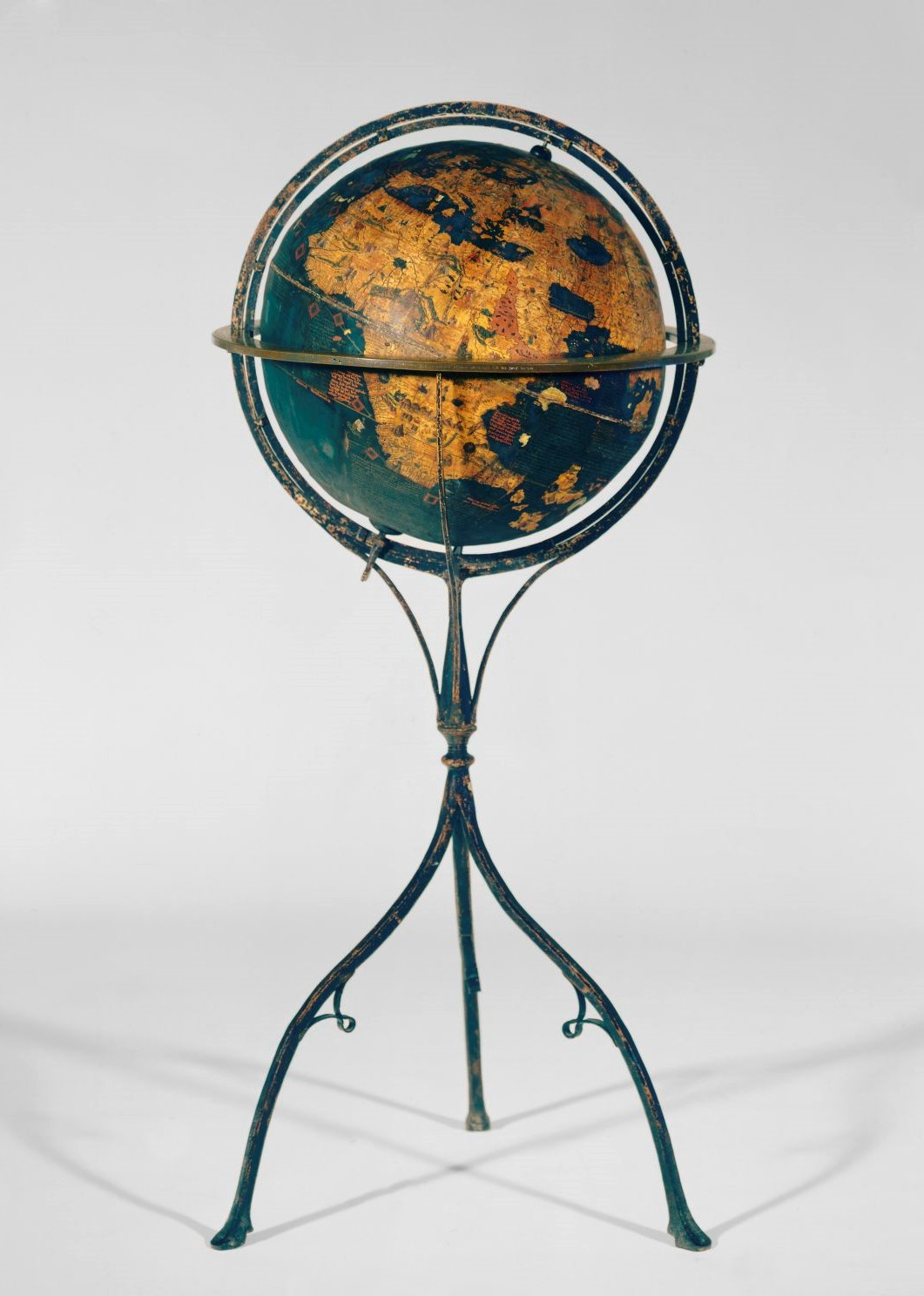
The "Erdapfel" of Martin Beheim is the oldest surviving terrestrial globe, made between 1491 and 1493.

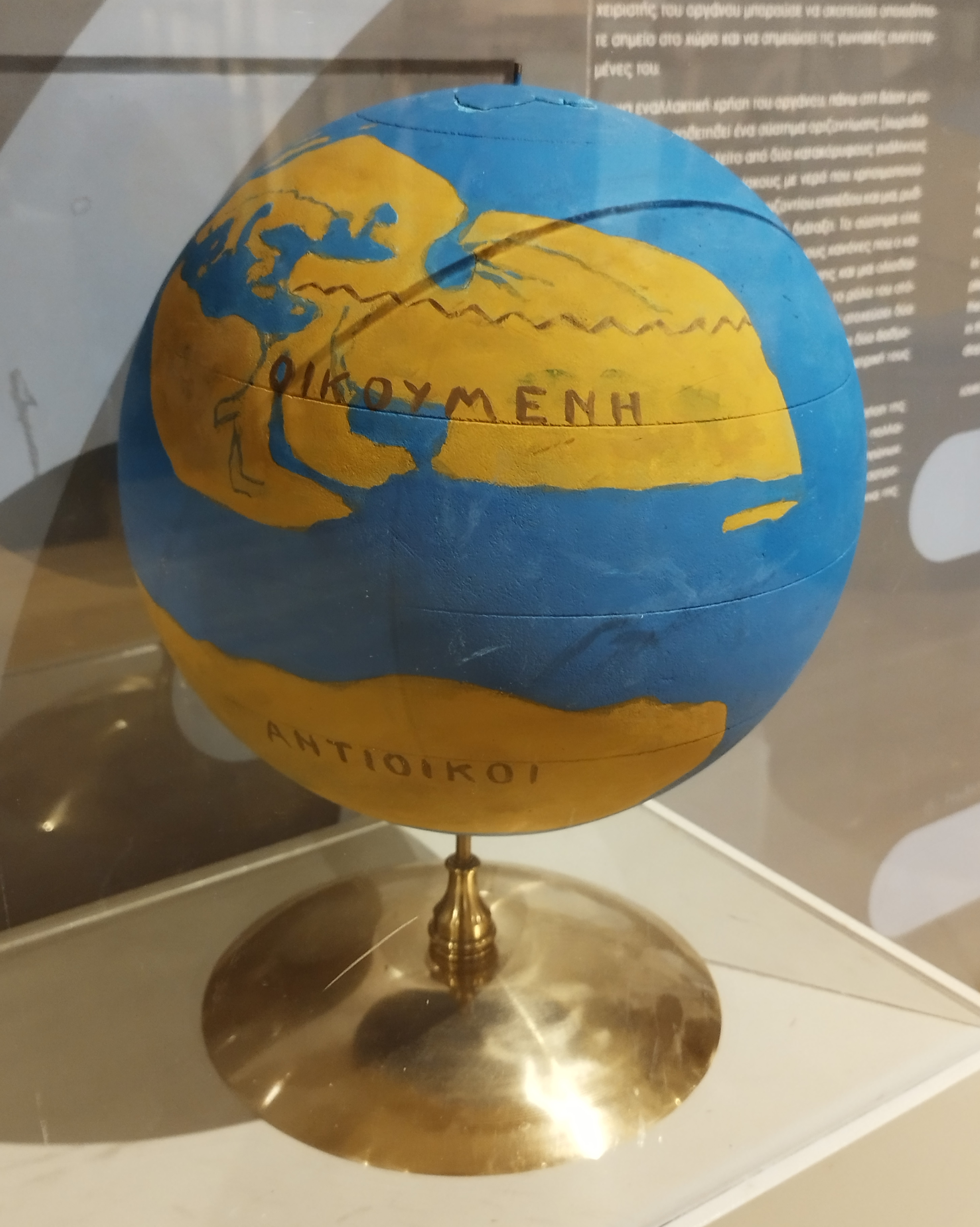
A replica of the globe of Crates of Mallus

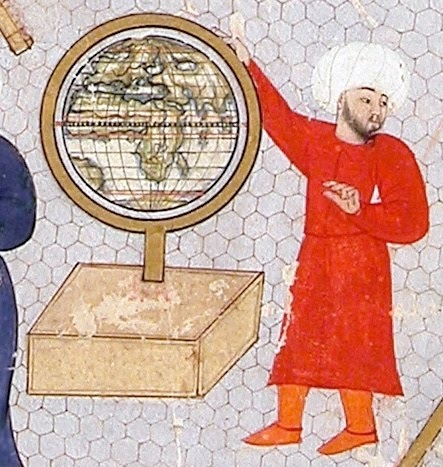
Globe at the Constantinople observatory of Taqi ad-Din between 1575-1580 CE.

The sphericity of the Earth was established by Greek astronomy in the 3rd century BC, and the earliest terrestrial globe appeared from that period. The earliest known example is the one constructed by Crates of Mallus in Cilicia (now Çukurova in modern-day Turkey), in the mid-2nd century BC.

No terrestrial globes from Antiquity have survived. An example of a surviving celestial globe is part of a Hellenistic sculpture, called the Farnese Atlas, surviving in a 2nd-century AD Roman copy in the Naples Archaeological Museum, Italy.

Early terrestrial globes depicting the entirety of the Old World were constructed in the Islamic world. During the Middle Ages in Christian Europe, while there are writings alluding to the idea that the earth was spherical, no known attempts at making a globe took place before the fifteenth century. The earliest extant terrestrial globe was made in 1492 by Martin Behaim (1459–1507) with help from the painter Georg Glockendon. Behaim was a German mapmaker, navigator, and merchant. Working in Nuremberg, Germany, he called his globe the "Nürnberg Terrestrial Globe." It is now known as the Erdapfel. Before constructing the globe, Behaim had traveled extensively. He sojourned in Lisbon from 1480, developing commercial interests and mingling with explorers and scientists. He began to construct his globe after his return to Nürnberg in 1490.

China made many mapping advancements such as sophisticated land surveys and the invention of the magnetic compass. However, no record of terrestrial globes in China exists until a globe was introduced by the Persian astronomer, Jamal ad-Din, in 1276.

Another early globe, the Hunt–Lenox Globe, ca. 1510, is thought to be the source of the phrase Hic Sunt Dracones, or "Here be dragons". A facsimile globe showing America was made by Martin Waldseemüller in 1507. Another "remarkably modern-looking" terrestrial globe of the Earth was constructed by Taqi ad-Din at his observatory in Constantinople during the 1570s.

The world's first seamless celestial globe was built by Mughal scientists under the patronage of Jahangir.

Globus IMP, electro-mechanical devices including five-inch globes have been used in Soviet and Russian spacecraft from 1961 to 2002 as navigation instruments. In 2001, the TMA version of the Soyuz spacecraft replaced this instrument with a digital map.

== Manufacture ==
A short, 1955 Dutch film showing the traditional manufacture of globes using paper gores

Traditionally, globes were manufactured by gluing a printed paper map onto a sphere, often made from wood.

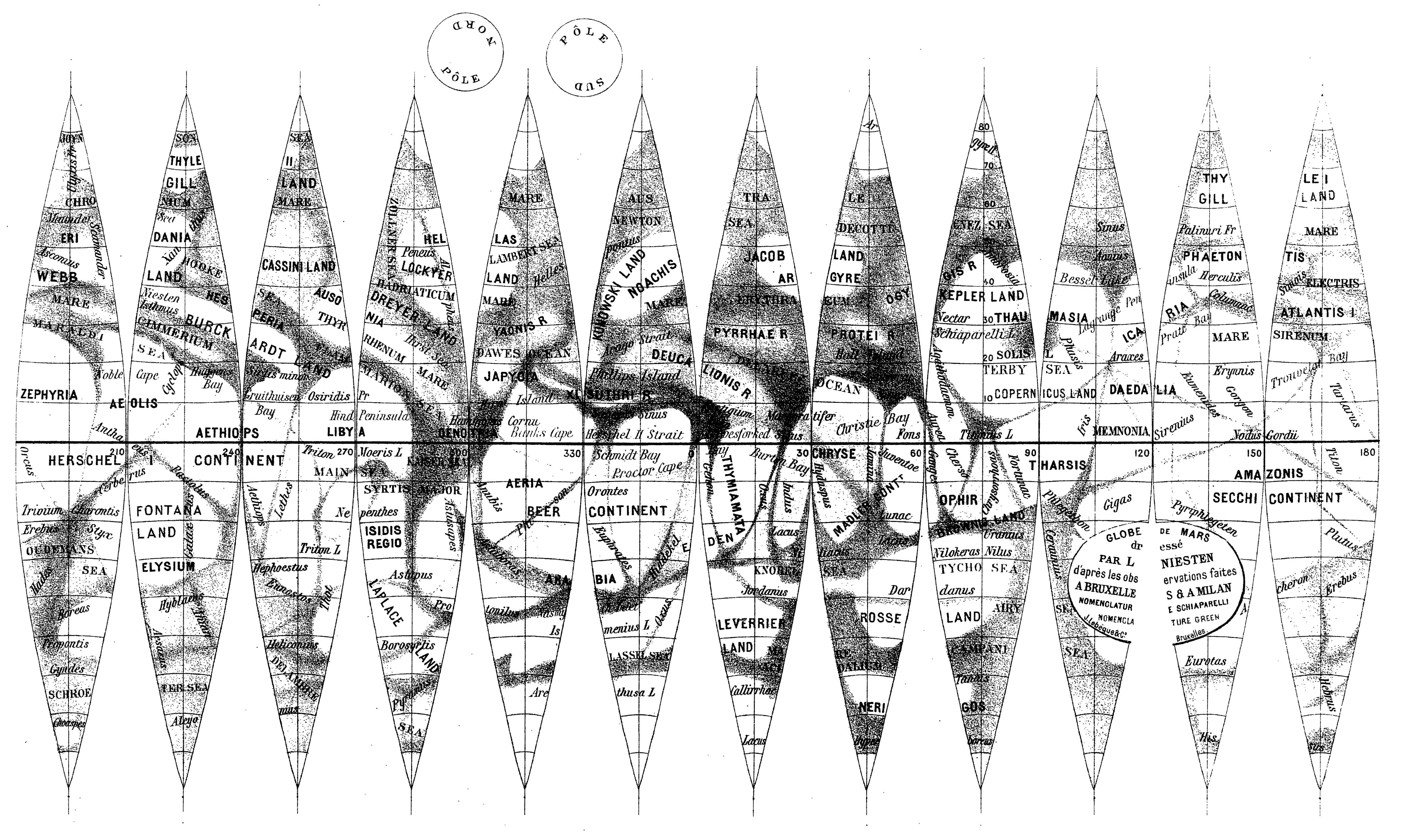
19th century map of Mars in flat printed gores, to be wrapped around a globe.

The most common type has long, thin gores (strips) of paper that narrow to a point at the poles, small disks cover over the inevitable irregularities at these points. The more gores there are, the less stretching and crumpling is required to make the paper map fit the sphere. This method of globe making was illustrated in 1802 in an engraving in The English Encyclopedia by George Kearsley.

Modern globes are often made from thermoplastic. Flat, plastic disks are printed with a distorted map of one of the Earth's hemispheres. This is placed in a machine which molds the disk into a hemispherical shape. The hemisphere is united with its opposite counterpart to form a complete globe.

Usually a globe is mounted so that its rotation axis is 23.5° (0.41 rad) from vertical, which is the angle the Earth's rotation axis deviates from perpendicular to the plane of its orbit. This mounting makes it easy to visualize how seasons change.

In the 1800s small pocket globes (less than 3 inches) were status symbols for gentlemen and educational toys for rich children.

== Examples ==
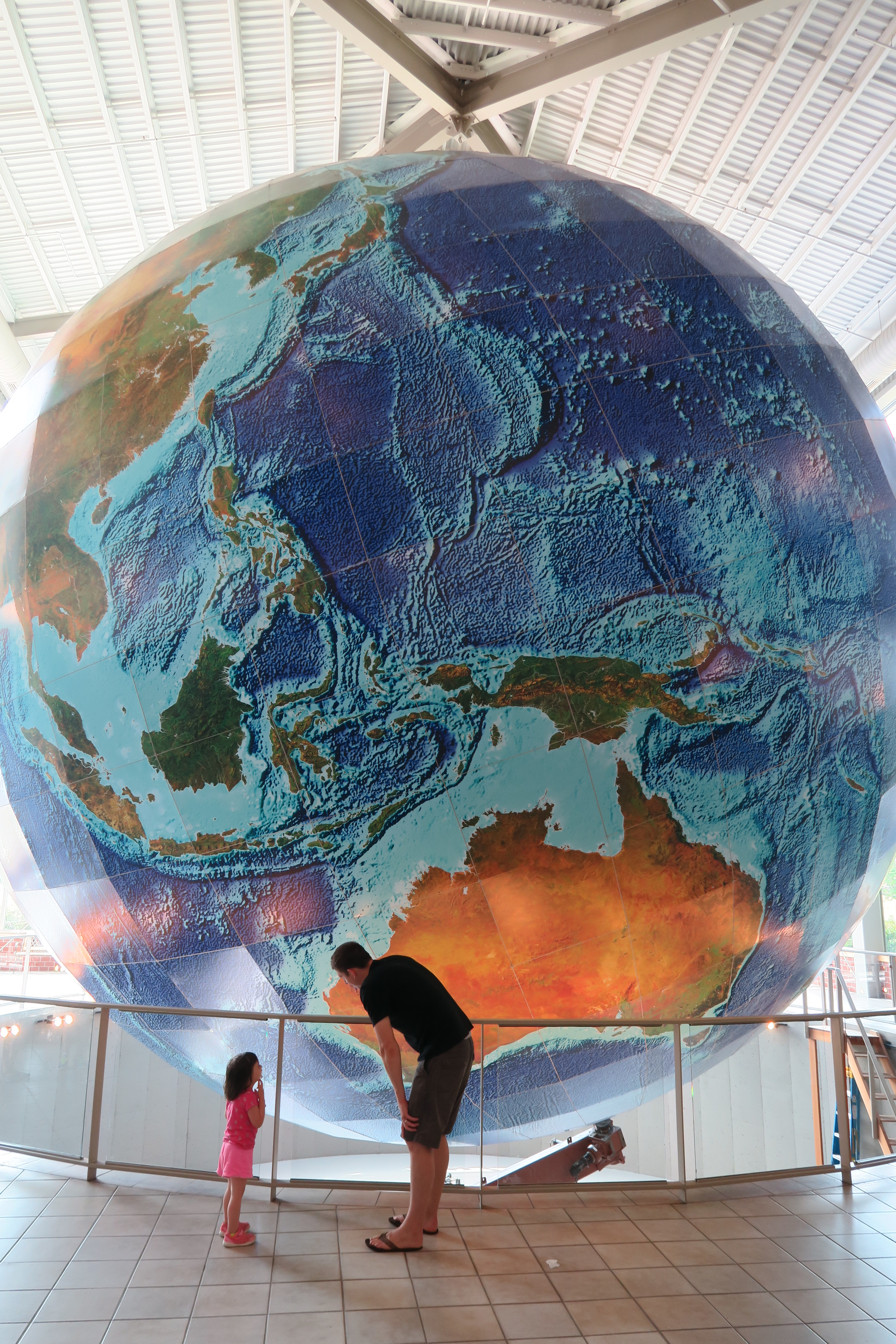
Eartha, the largest rotating globe

Sorted in decreasing sizes:

- The Unisphere in Flushing Meadows, New York, at the Billie Jean King USTA Tennis Center, at 37 m (120 ft) in diameter, is the world's largest geographical globe. This corresponds to a scale of about 1:350 000. (There are larger spherical structures, such as the Cinesphere in Toronto, Ontario, Canada, but this does not have geographical or astronomical markings.)
- Wyld's Great Globe, located in London's Leicester Square from 1851-1862, was a hollow globe 60 feet 4 inches (18.39 m) in diameter designed by mapmaker James Wyld. Visitors could climb stairs to view a plaster of Paris model of the Earth's surface, complete with mountains and rivers to scale.
- Eartha, the world's largest rotating globe with a diameter of 12 m (41 ft), located at the DeLorme headquarters in Yarmouth, Maine. This corresponds to a scale of about 1:1.1 million. Eartha was constructed in 1998.
- The P-I Globe, a 13.5-ton 30-foot (9.1 m) neon globe with rotating "It's in the P-I" words and an 18-foot eagle, was made in 1948 for the Seattle Post-Intelligencer's headquarters. It was moved to the newspaper's new location in 1986.
- The Great Globe at Swanage is a stone sphere that stands at Durlston Castle within Durlston Country Park, England. Measuring 10 feet (3.0 m) in diameter and weighing 40 tons, this intricately carved globe showcases the continents, oceans, and specific regions of the world. Crafted from Portland stone, it spans about 3 meters (10 ft) in diameter.

== Gallery ==
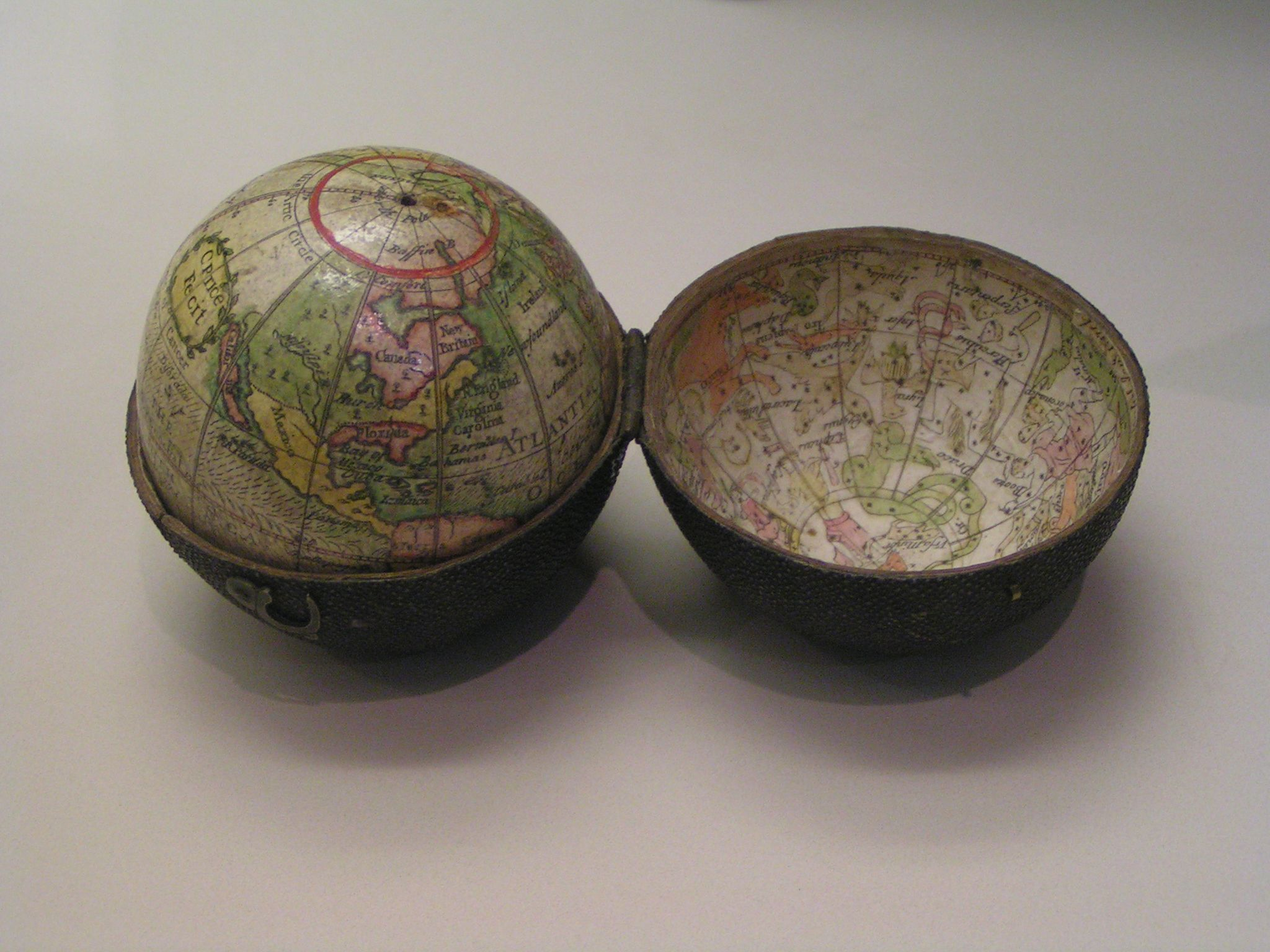
A 1716 pocket terrestrial globe with celestial globe case.

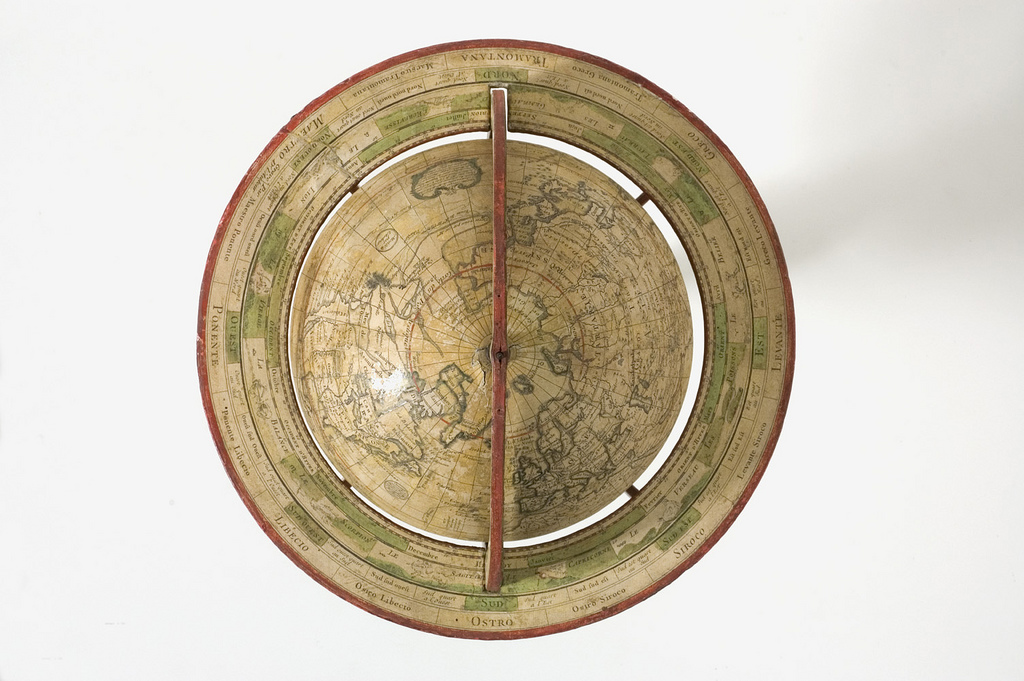
Top view of a 1765 globe.

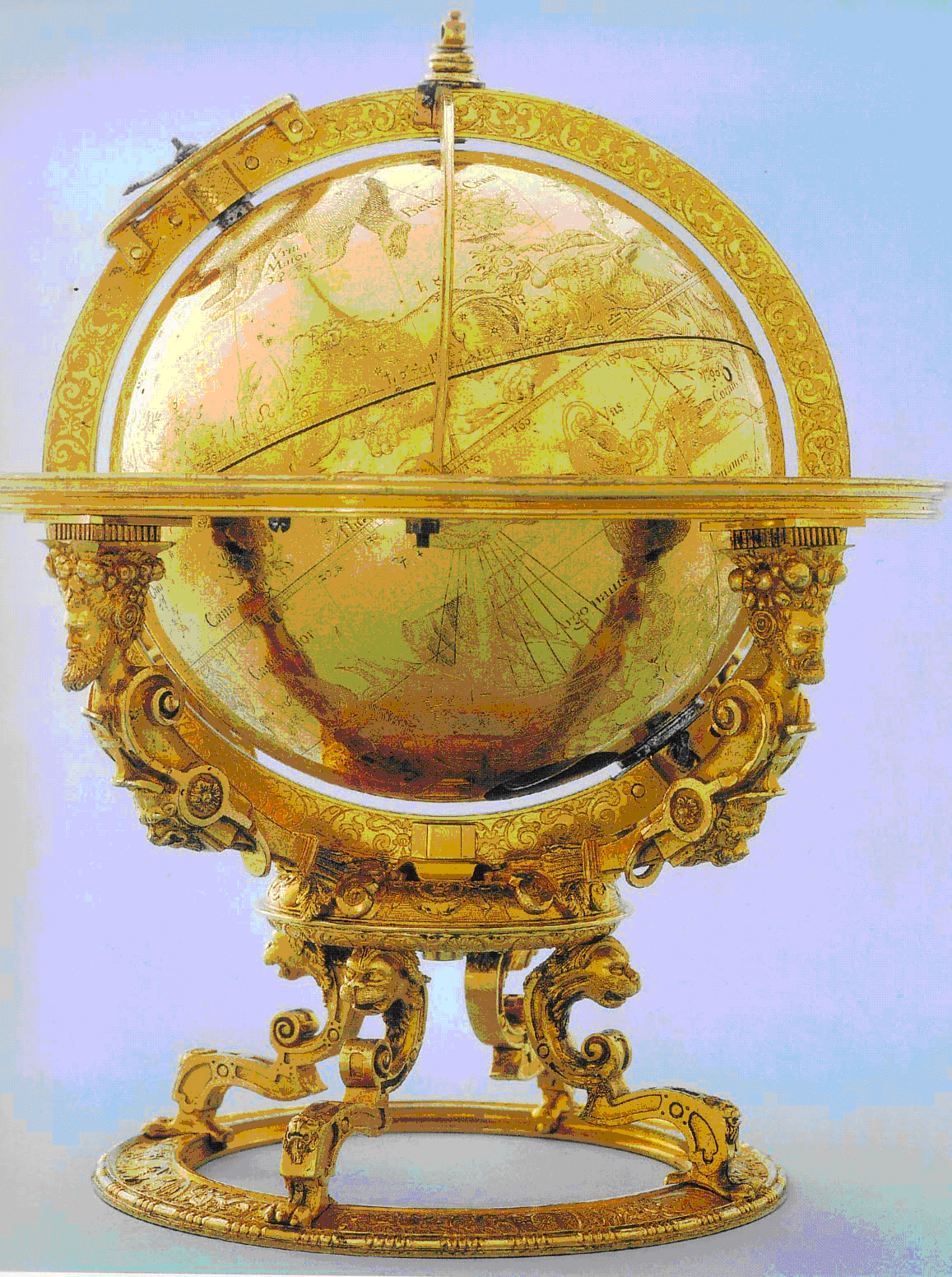
Mechanised 1594 celestial globe.

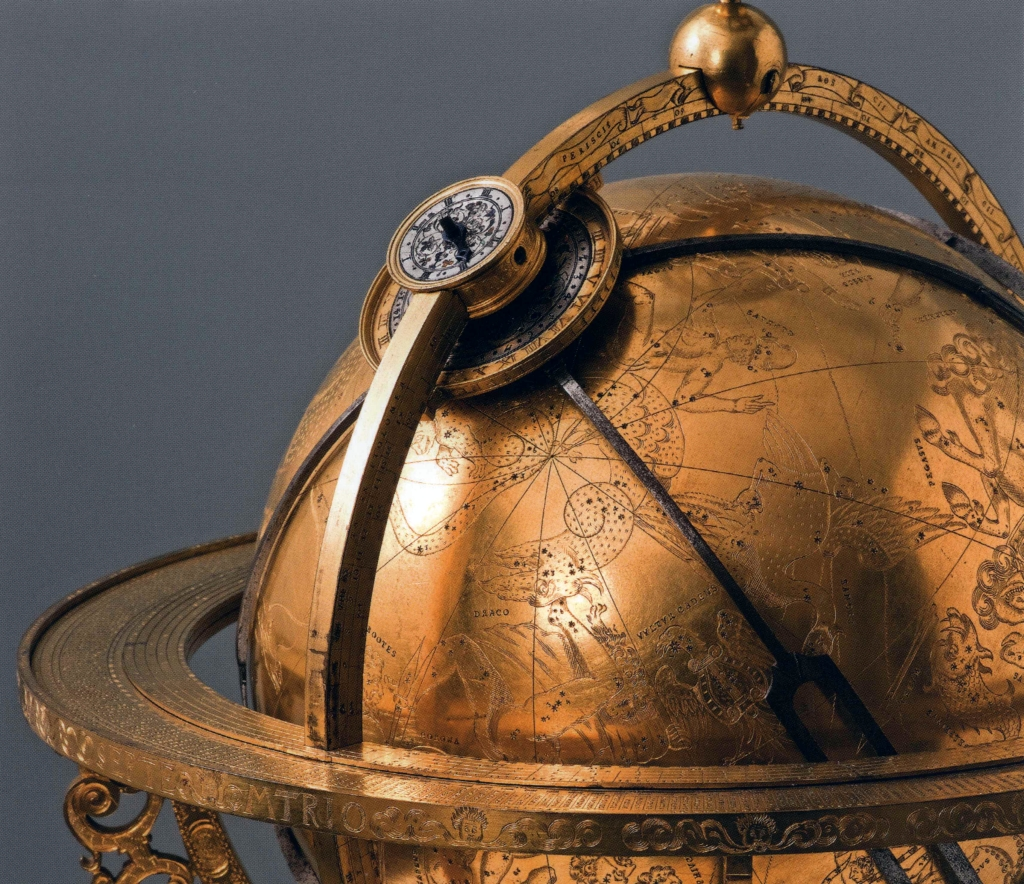
Detail of a 1586 mechanised celestial globe.

Spinning a globe written in Japanese

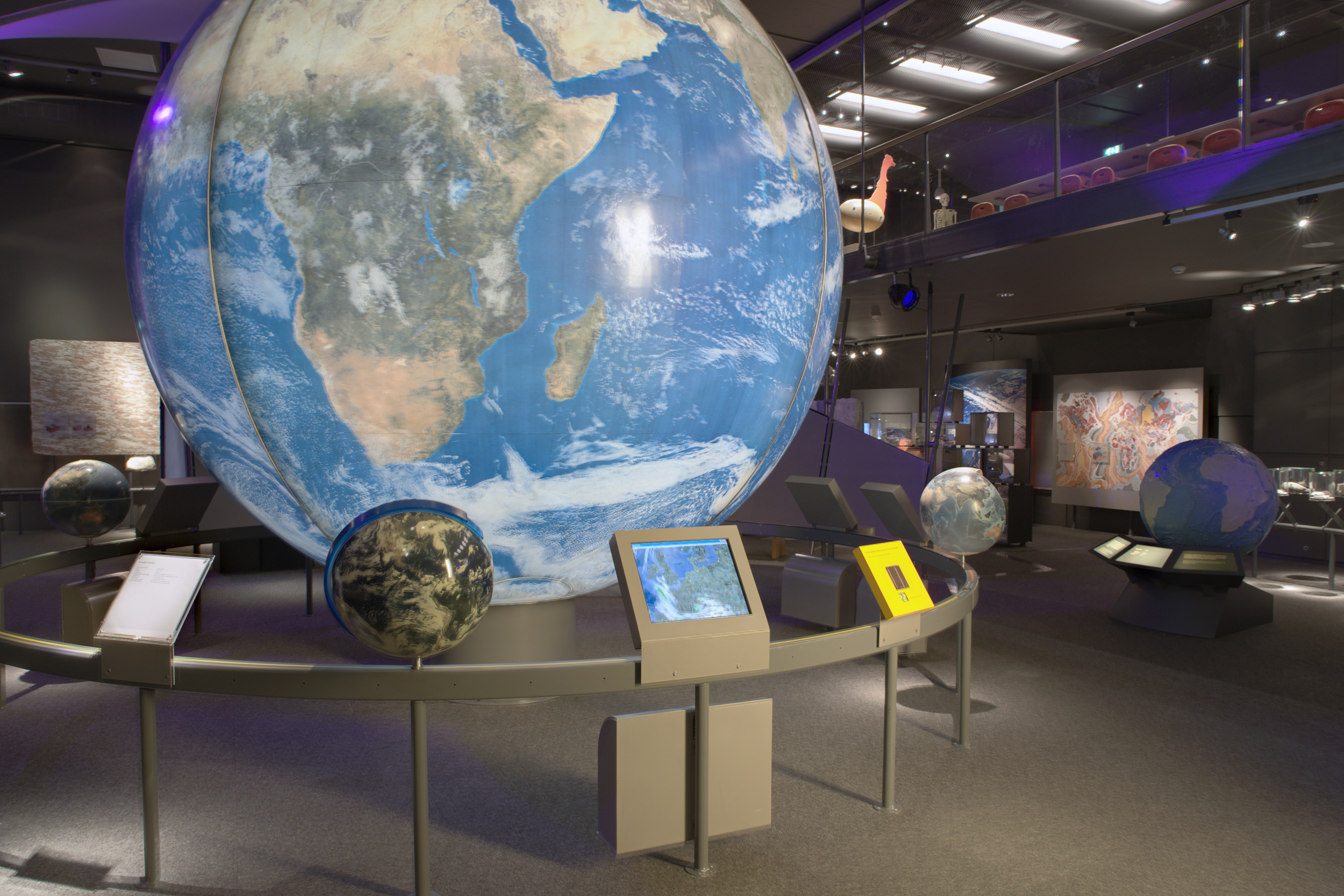
Exhibit with multiple globes of the earth, each conveying various information.

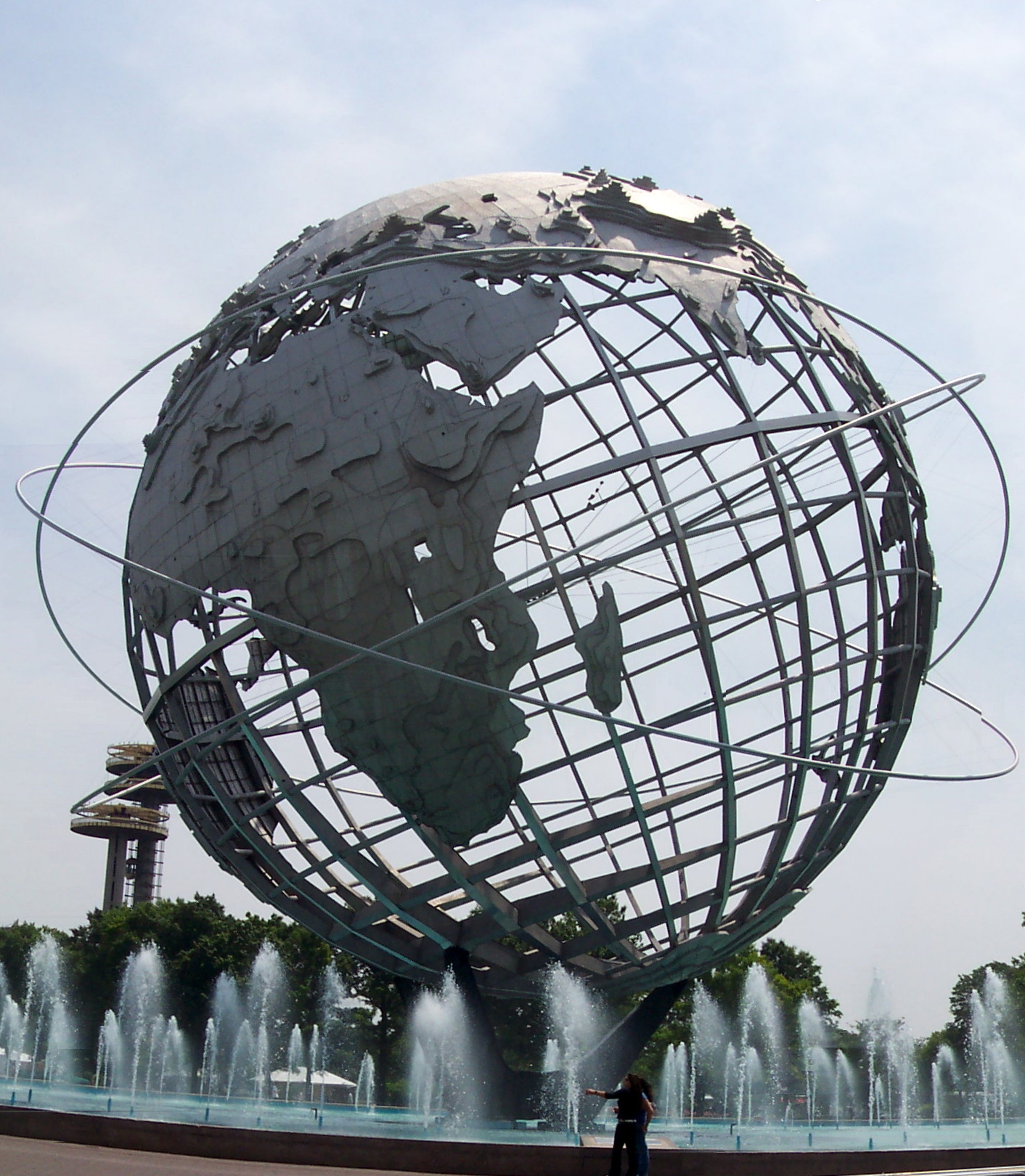
The Unisphere, the largest geographical globe.

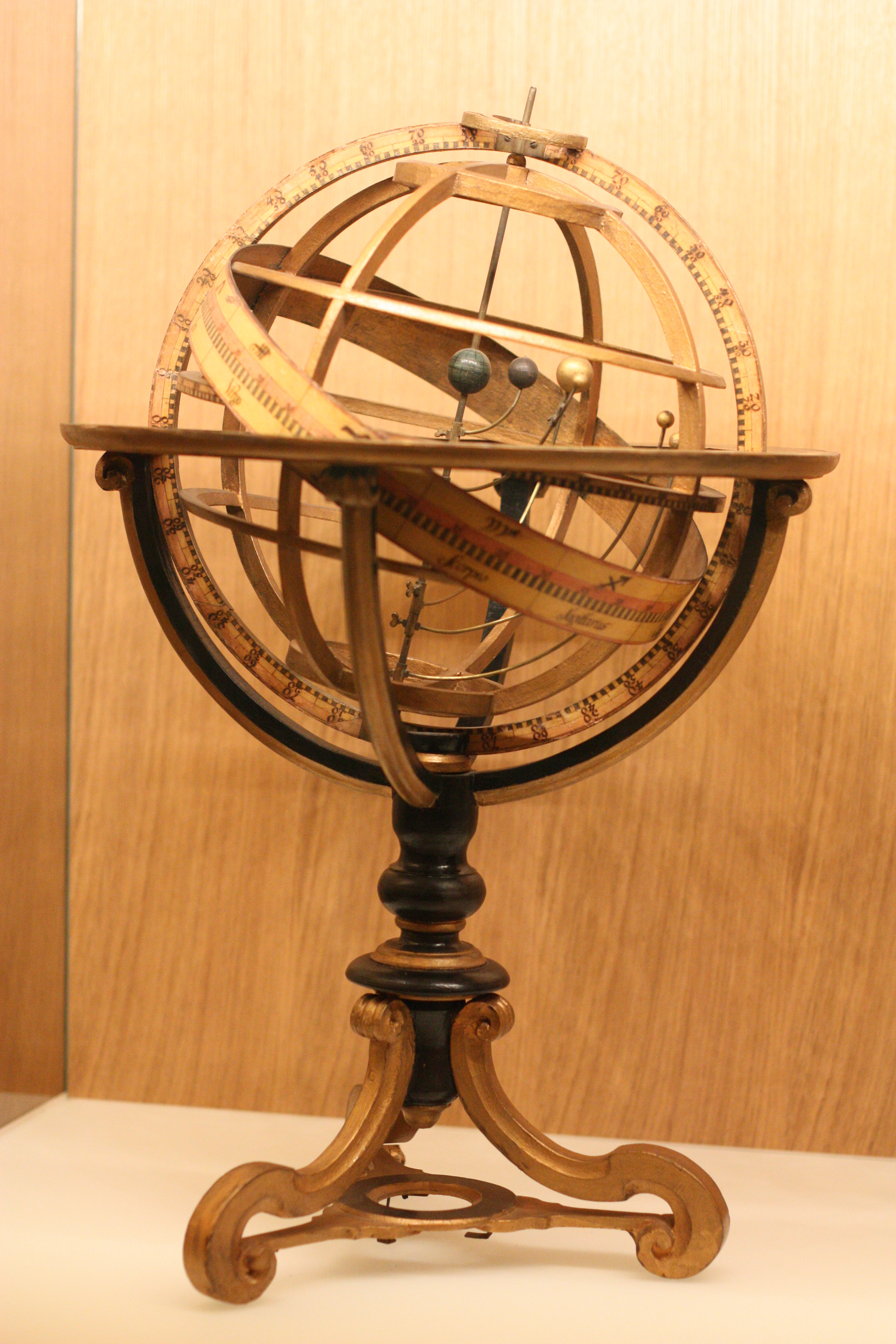
Example of an Armillary sphere.

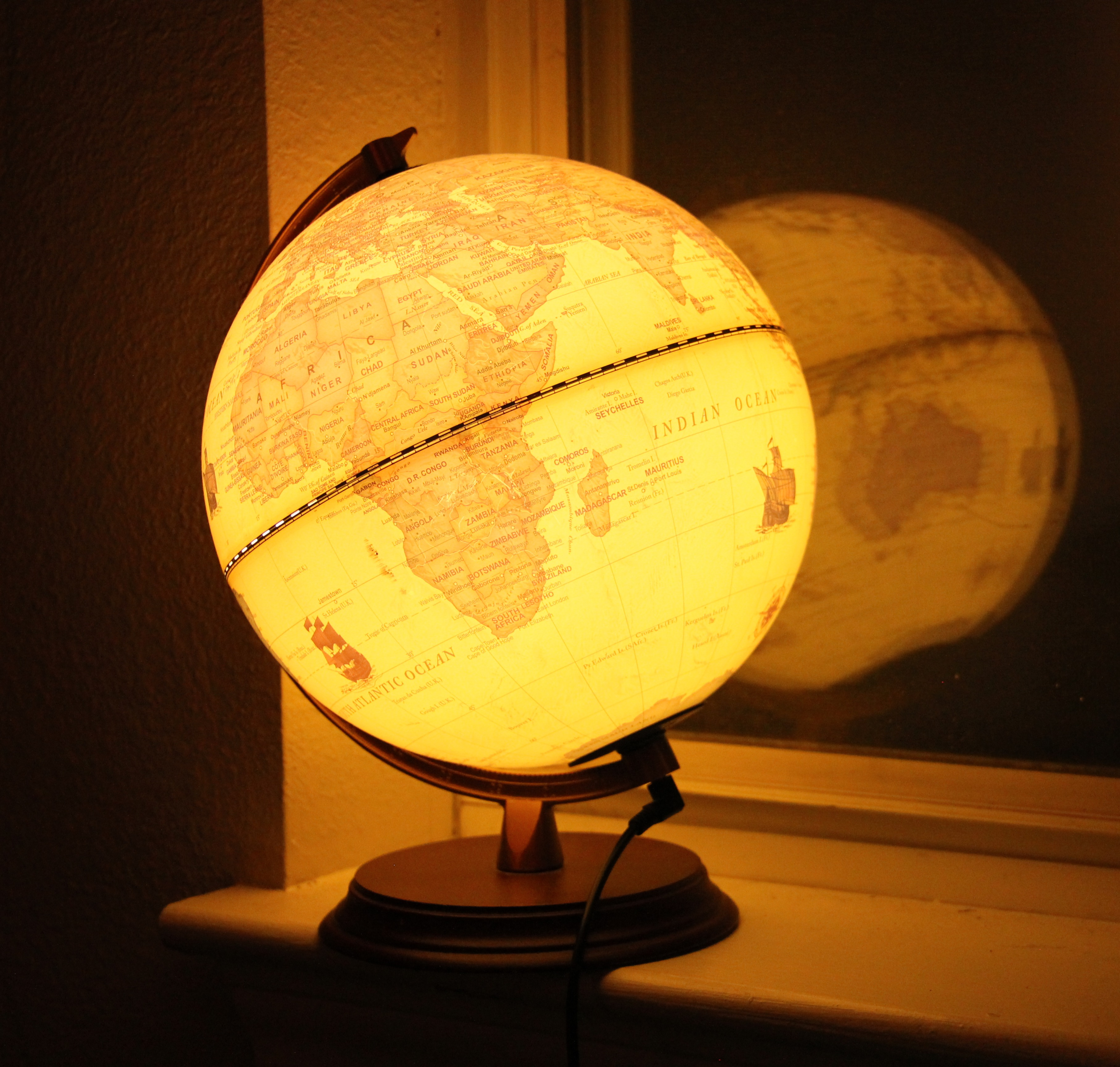
Plug-in light-up decorative globe

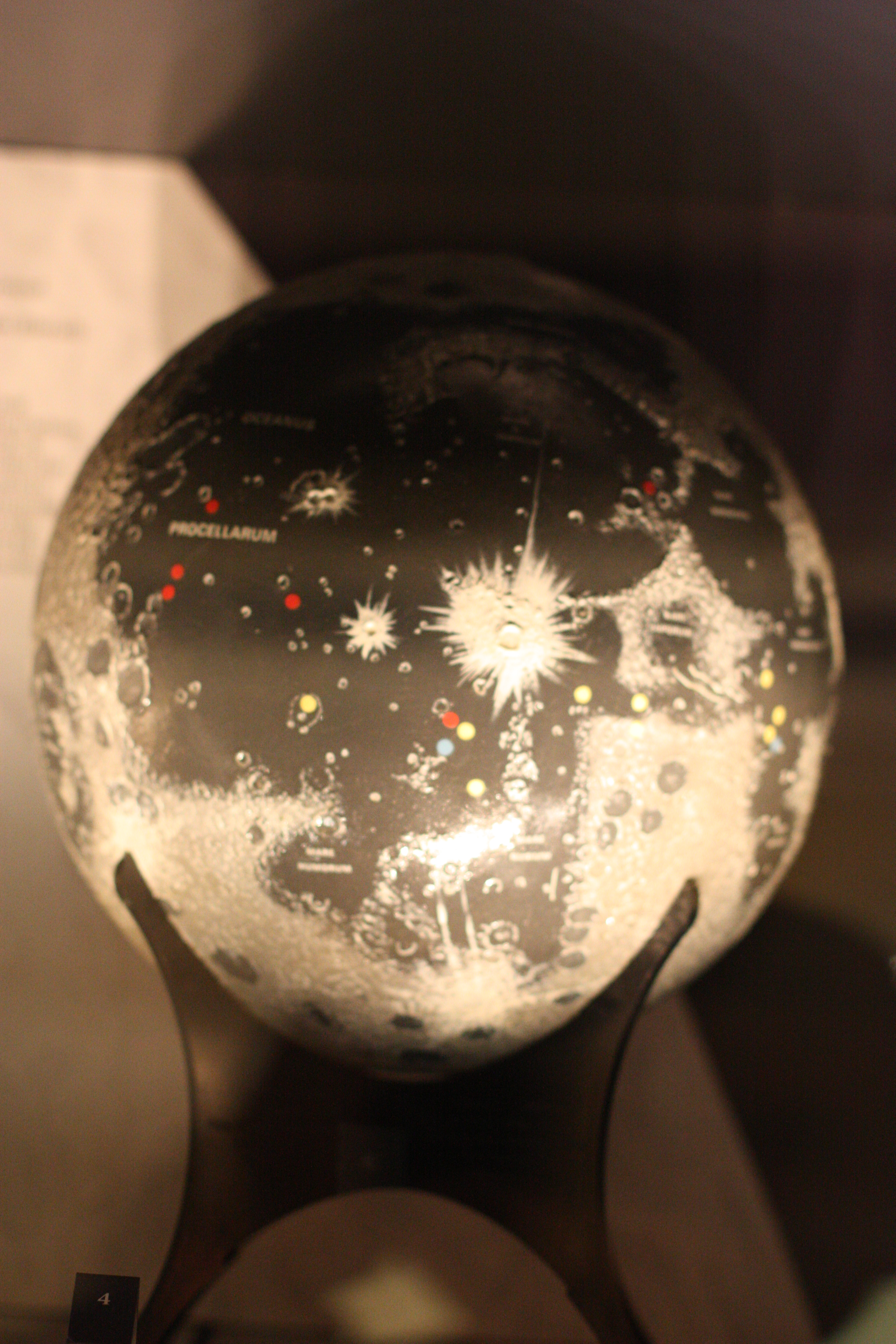
Globe of the Moon.

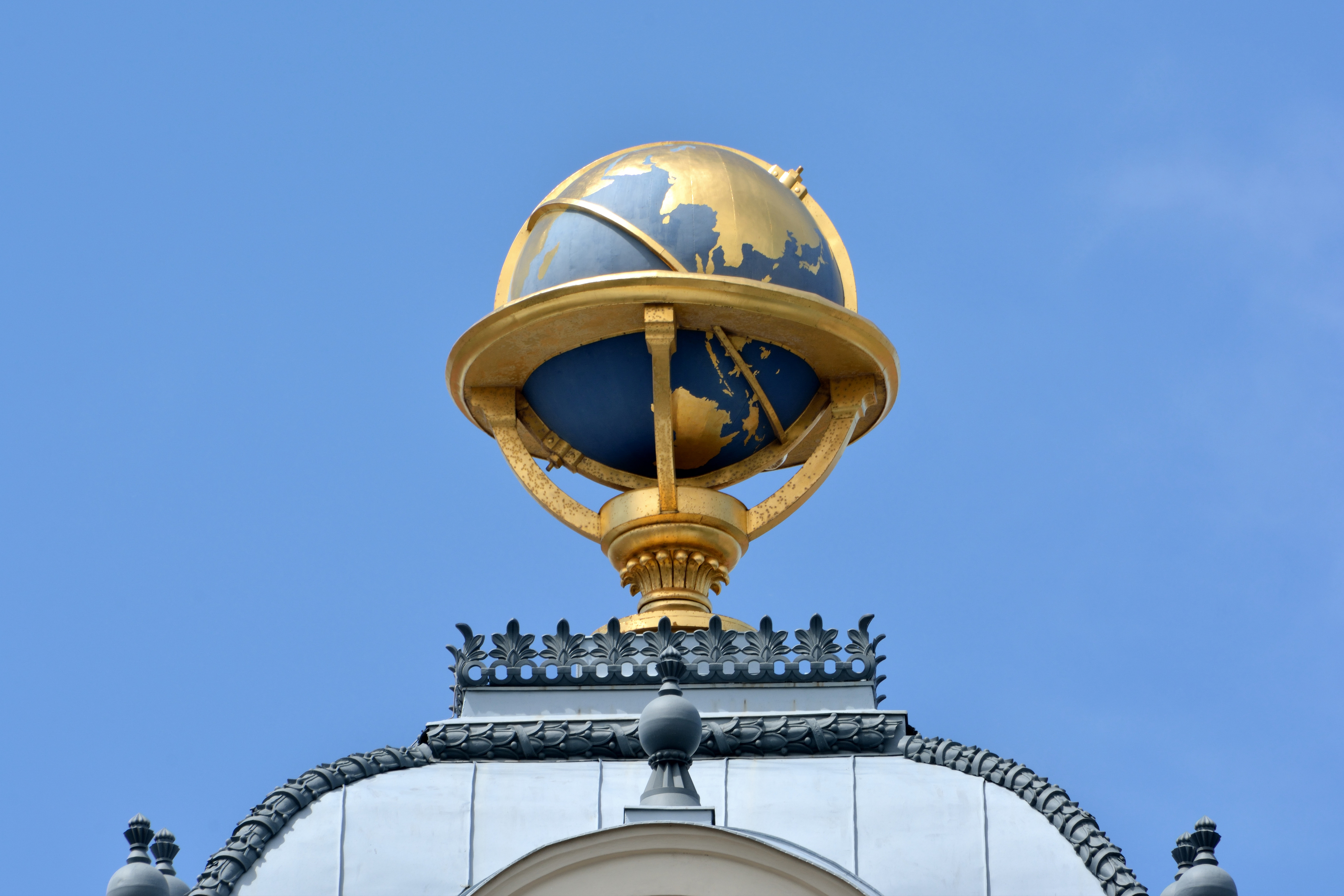
Globe used as a decorative architectural element.

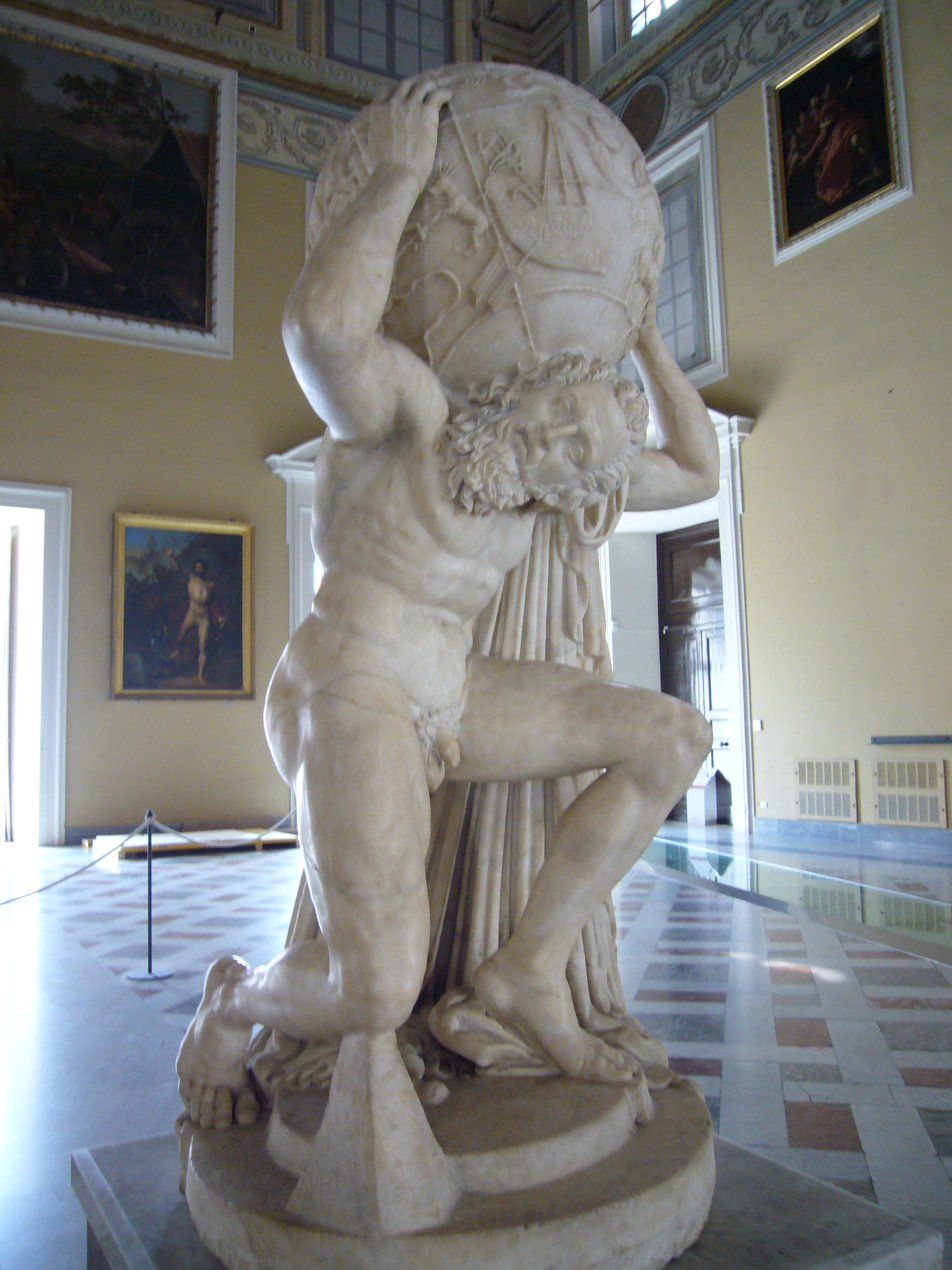
Farnese Atlas, ancient Roman sculpture of Atlas holding up a celestial globe.

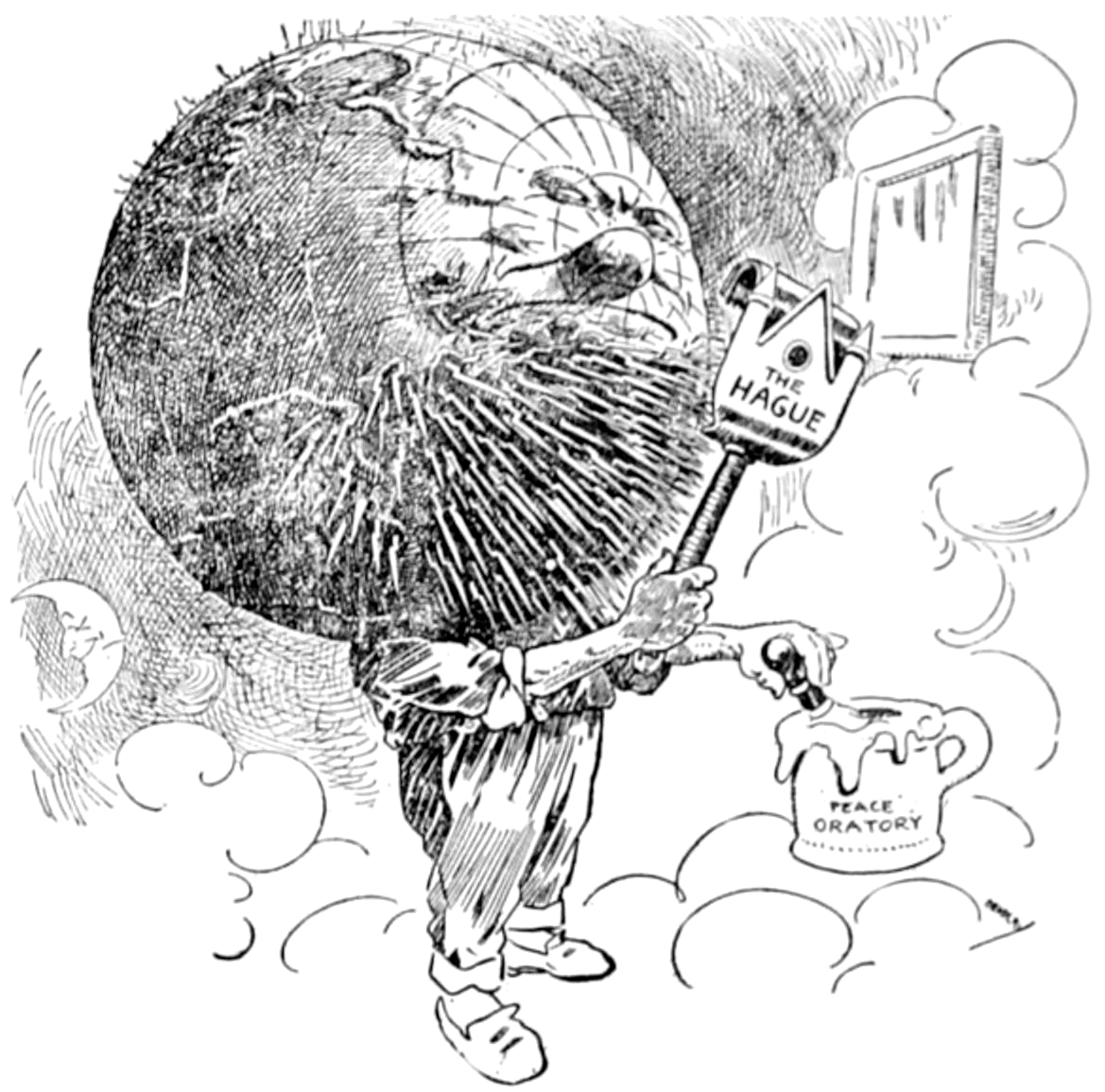
Cartoon of globe anthropomorphized as human.

== See also ==
- Analemma
- Armillary sphere
- Cartography
- Dymaxion map
- Earth in culture
- Ellen Eliza Fitz
- Emery Molyneux
- Globus Jagellonicus
- Hunt–Lenox Globe
- Johannes Schöner globe
- Orrery
- Planetarium
- Science On a Sphere
- Virtual globe
- Voskhod Spacecraft "Globus" IMP navigation instrument
- Ibrahim ibn Said al-Sahli
