= Layout =

In general terms, a layout is a structured arrangement of items within certain limits, or a plan for such arrangement.

Specifically, layout may refer to:

- Page layout, the arrangement of visual elements on a page
  - Comprehensive layout (comp), a proposed page layout presented by a designer to their client
- Layout (computing), the process of calculating the position of objects in space
- Layout engine, another name for web browser engine, the core software that displays content in a web browser
- Automobile layout, a description of the locations of the engine and drive wheels on a vehicle
- Integrated circuit layout, the representation of an integrated circuit in geometric shapes
- Keyboard layout, an arrangement of the keys on a typographic keyboard
- Model railroad layout, a diorama with tracks for operating scaled-down trains
- Layout (dominoes), the tableau in a domino game
- Layout or marking out, the transfer of a design onto a workpiece in manufacturing
- Plant layout study, an engineering study to analyze physical configurations for a manufacturing plant
- Layout, a specific version of the splits, a position in which the legs are extended in opposite directions
- Process layout, a floor plan of a plant that arranges equipment according to its function
- Product layout, a floor plan of a plant in which work stations and equipment are ordered by assembly sequence
