= Celestial globe =

Star charts arranged on a globe

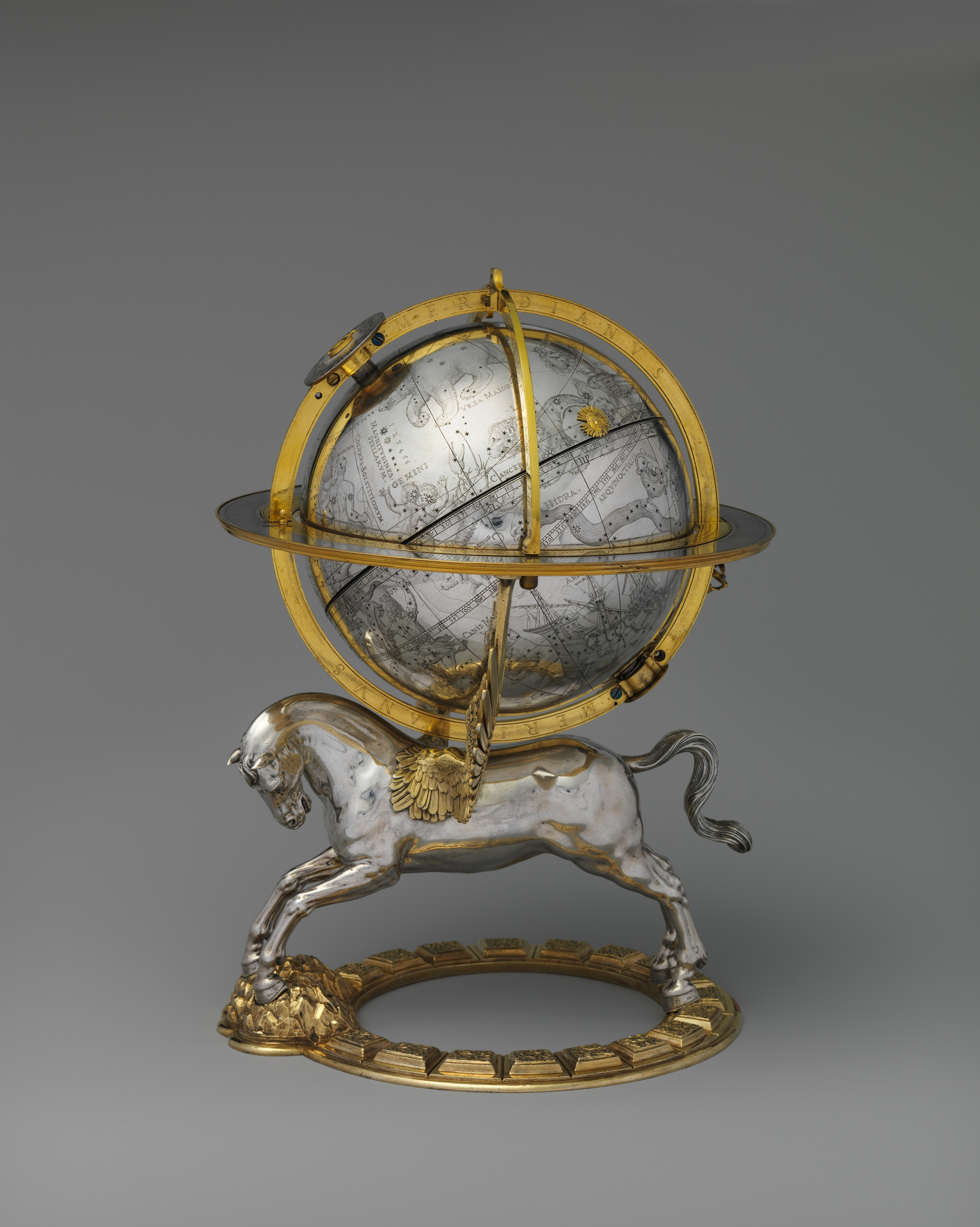
Celestial globe with clockwork; 1579; partly gilded silver, gilded brass and steel; overall: 27.3 cm × 20.3 cm × 19.1 cm (10.7 in × 8.0 in × 7.5 in), diameter of the globe: 14 cm (5.5 in); from Vienna; Metropolitan Museum of Art (New York City)

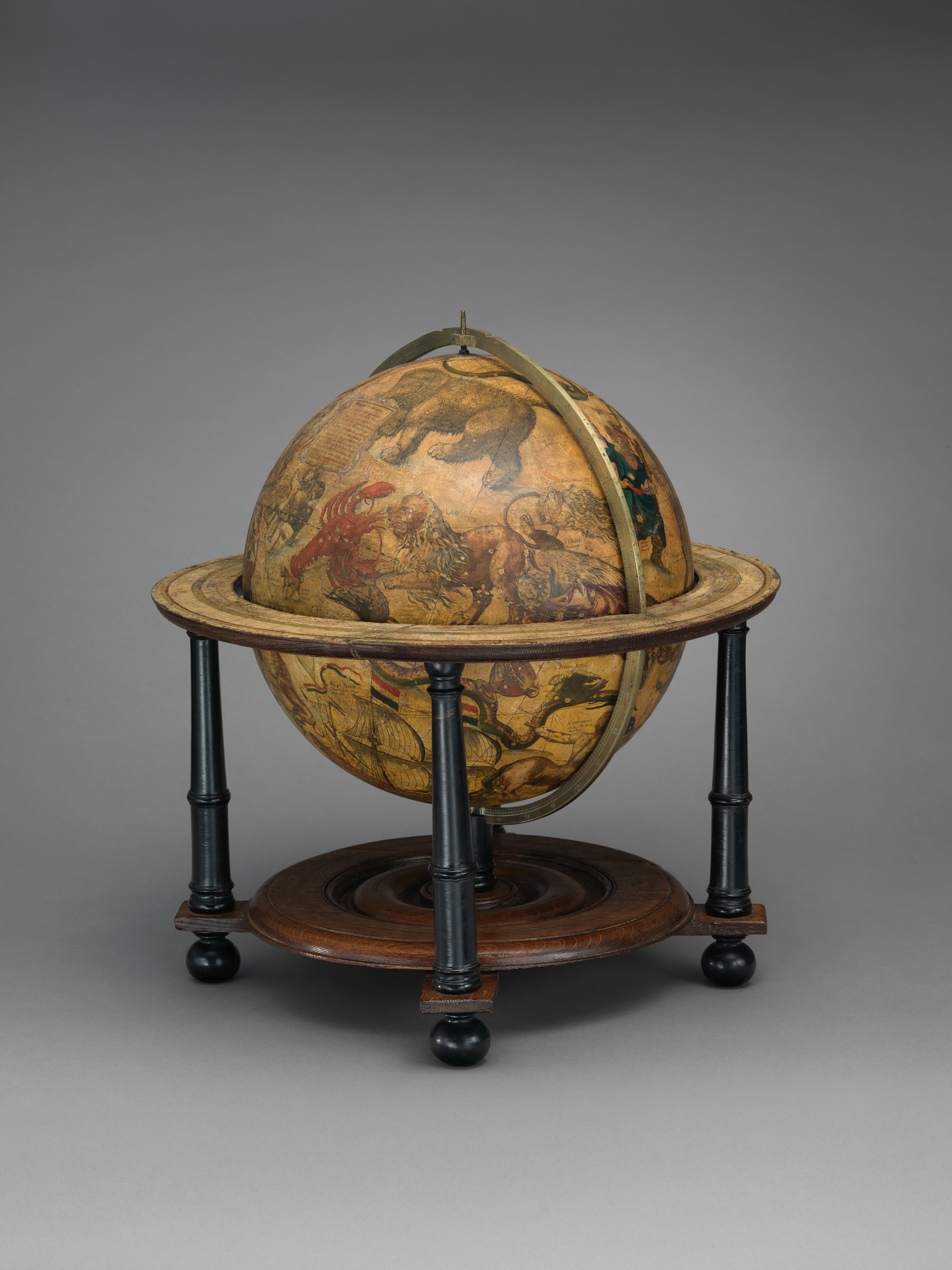
Celestial globe; after 1621; paper, brass, oak and stained and light-colored wood; overall: 52.1 cm × 47.3 cm (20.5 in × 18.6 in), diameter of the globe: 34 cm (13 in); from Amsterdam; Metropolitan Museum of Art

Mughal celestial globe by Muhammad Saleh Thattvi with Arabic and Sanskrit inscriptions, dated AH 1074 (1663–4 CE)

Celestial globes show the apparent positions of the stars in the sky. They omit the Sun, Moon, and planets because the positions of these bodies vary relative to those of the stars, but the ecliptic, along which the Sun moves, is indicated.

There is an issue regarding the "handedness" of celestial globes. If the globe is constructed so that the stars are in the positions they actually occupy on the imaginary celestial sphere, then the star field will appear reversed on the surface of the globe (all the constellations will appear as their mirror images). This is because the view from Earth, positioned at the centre of the celestial sphere, is of the gnomonic projection inside of the celestial sphere, whereas the celestial globe is orthographic projection as viewed from the outside. For this reason, celestial globes are often produced in mirror image, so that at least the constellations appear as viewed from Earth. This ambiguity is famously evident in the astronomical ceiling of New York City's Grand Central Terminal, whose inconsistency was deliberately left uncorrected though it was noticed shortly after installation.

Some modern celestial globes address this problem by making the surface of the globe transparent. The stars can then be placed in their proper positions and viewed through the globe, so that the view is of the inside of the celestial sphere. However, the proper position from which to view the sphere would be from its centre, but the viewer of a transparent globe must be outside it, far from its centre. Viewing the inside of the sphere from the outside, through its transparent surface, produces serious distortions. Opaque celestial globes that are made with the constellations correctly placed, so they appear as mirror images when directly viewed from outside the globe, are often viewed in a mirror, so the constellations have their familiar appearances. Written material on the globe, e.g., constellation names, is printed in reverse, so it can easily be read in the mirror.

Before Copernicus's 16th-century discovery that the Solar System is "heliocentric rather than geocentric and geostatic" (that the Earth orbits the Sun and not the other way around) "the stars have been commonly, though perhaps not universally, perceived as though attached to the inside of a hollow sphere enclosing and rotating about the earth". Working under the incorrect assumption that the cosmos was geocentric the second-century Greek astronomer Ptolemy composed the Almagest in which "the movements of the planets could be accurately represented by means of techniques involving the use of epicycles, deferents, eccentrics (whereby planetary motion is conceived as circular with respect to a point displaced from Earth), and equants (a device that posits a constant angular rate of rotation with respect to a point displaced from Earth)". Guided by these ideas astronomers of the Middle Ages, Muslim and Christian alike, created celestial globes to "represent in a model the arrangement and movement of the stars". In their most basic form celestial globes represent the stars as if the viewer were looking down upon the sky as a globe that surrounds the Earth.

== History ==
=== Ancient Greece ===
The Roman writer Cicero reported the statements of the Roman astronomer Gaius Sulpicius Gallus of the second century BC, the first globe was constructed by Thales of Miletus. This could indicate that celestial globes were in production throughout antiquity however, without any celestial globes surviving from this time, it is difficult to say for sure. What is known is that in book VIII, chapter 3 of Ptolemy's Almagest he outlines ideas for the design and production of a celestial globe. This includes some notes on how the globe should be decorated, suggesting ‘the sphere a dark colour resembling the night sky’.

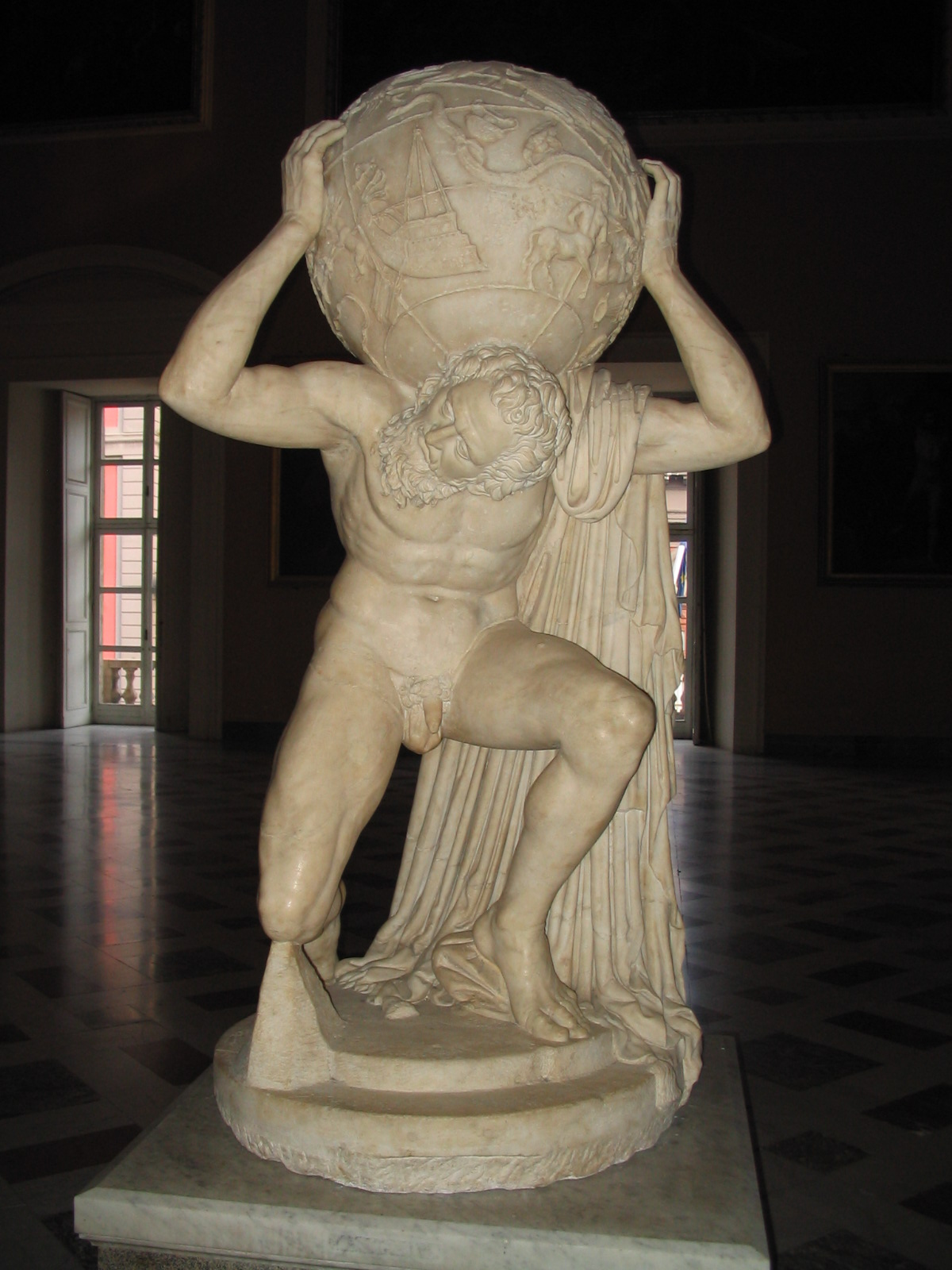
Farnese Atlas (Museo Archeologico Nazionale, Naples), the oldest still existing celestial globe

The Farnese Atlas, a 2nd-century AD Roman marble sculpture of Atlas which probably copies an earlier work of the Hellenistic era, is holding a celestial globe 65 cm (26 in) in diameter, which for many years was the only known celestial globe from the ancient world. No stars are depicted on the globe, but it shows over 40 classical Greek constellations in substantial detail. In the 1990s, two smaller celestial globes from antiquity became public: one from brass measuring 11 cm (4.3 in) held by the Römisch-Germanisches Zentralmuseum, and one from gilt silver measuring 6.3 cm (2.5 in) privately held by the Kugel family.

=== Al-Sufi's The Book of Fixed Stars ===
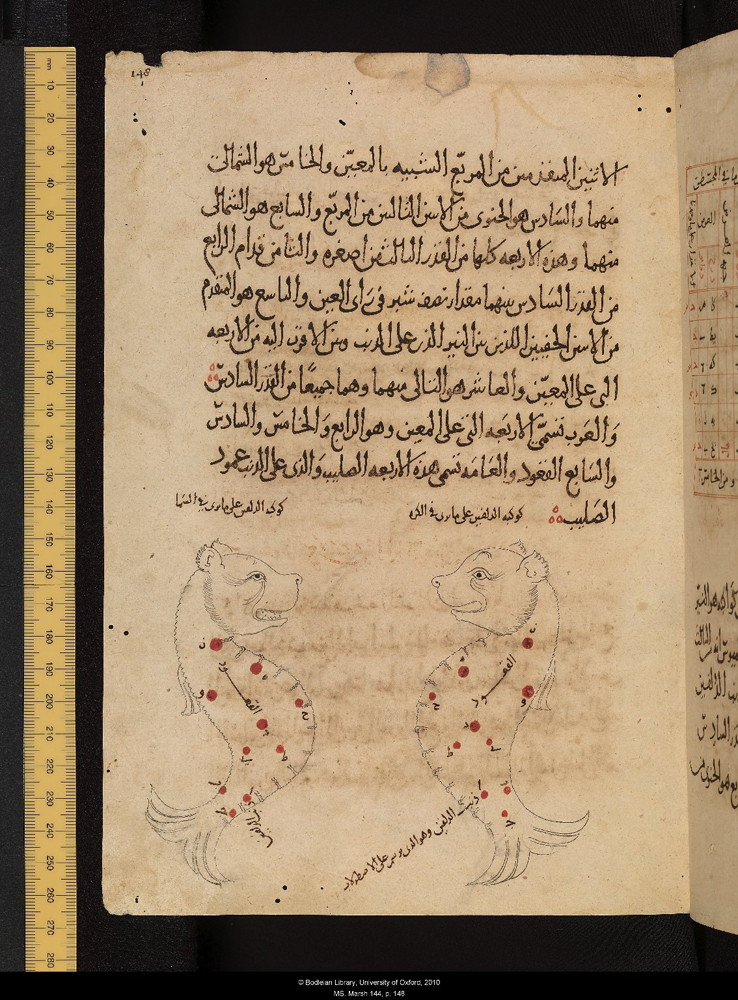
Constellation of Delphinus from a copy of 'Abd al-Rahman al-Sufi's Book of Fixed Stars, 1125

Abd al-Rahman al-Sufi was an important 10th-century astronomer whose works were instrumental in the Islamic development of the celestial globe. His book, The Book of Fixed Stars, designed for accuracy for the year 964, was a "description of the constellations that combines Greek/ Ptolemaic traditions with Arabic/Bedouin ones". The Book of Fixed Stars then served as an important source of star coordinates for makers of astrolabes and globes across the Islamic world. Similarly, it was "instrumental in displacing the traditional Bedouin constellation imagery and replacing it with the Greek/Ptolemaic system which ultimately came to dominate all astronomy".

=== 11th century ===
The earliest surviving celestial globe was made between 1080 and 1085 C.E. by Ibrahim ibn Said al-Sahli, a well-known astrolabe maker working in Valencia, Spain. Although the imagery on this globe appears to be unrelated to that in al-Sufi's The Book of the Constellations al-Wazzan does seem to have been aware of this work, as all forty-eight of the classical Greek constellations are illustrated on the globe, just as in al-Sufi's treatise, with the stars indicated by circles.

=== 13th century ===
In the 13th century, a celestial globe, now housed in the Mathematisch-Physikalischer Salon in Dresden, was produced at one of the most important centres of astronomy in intellectual history, the Ilkhanid observatory at Maragha in north-western Iran constructed in 1259 and headed by Nasir al-Dln TusT (d. 1274), the renowned polymath. This particular scientific instrument was made by the son of the renowned scientist Mu'ayyad al-'Urdi al-Dimashqi, Muhammad b. Mu'ayyad al-'Urdl in 1288. This globe is an interesting example of how celestial globes demonstrate both the scientific and the artistic talents of those who make them. All forty-eight classical constellations used in Ptolemy's Almagest are represented on the globe, meaning it could then be used in calculations for astronomy and astrology, such as navigation, time-keeping or determining a horoscope. Artistically, this globe is an insight into thirteenth century Iranian illustration as the thirteenth century was a period when inlaid brass became a premier medium for figural imagery and so the globes from this period are duly exceptional for the detail and clarity of their engraved figures.

=== 17th century ===
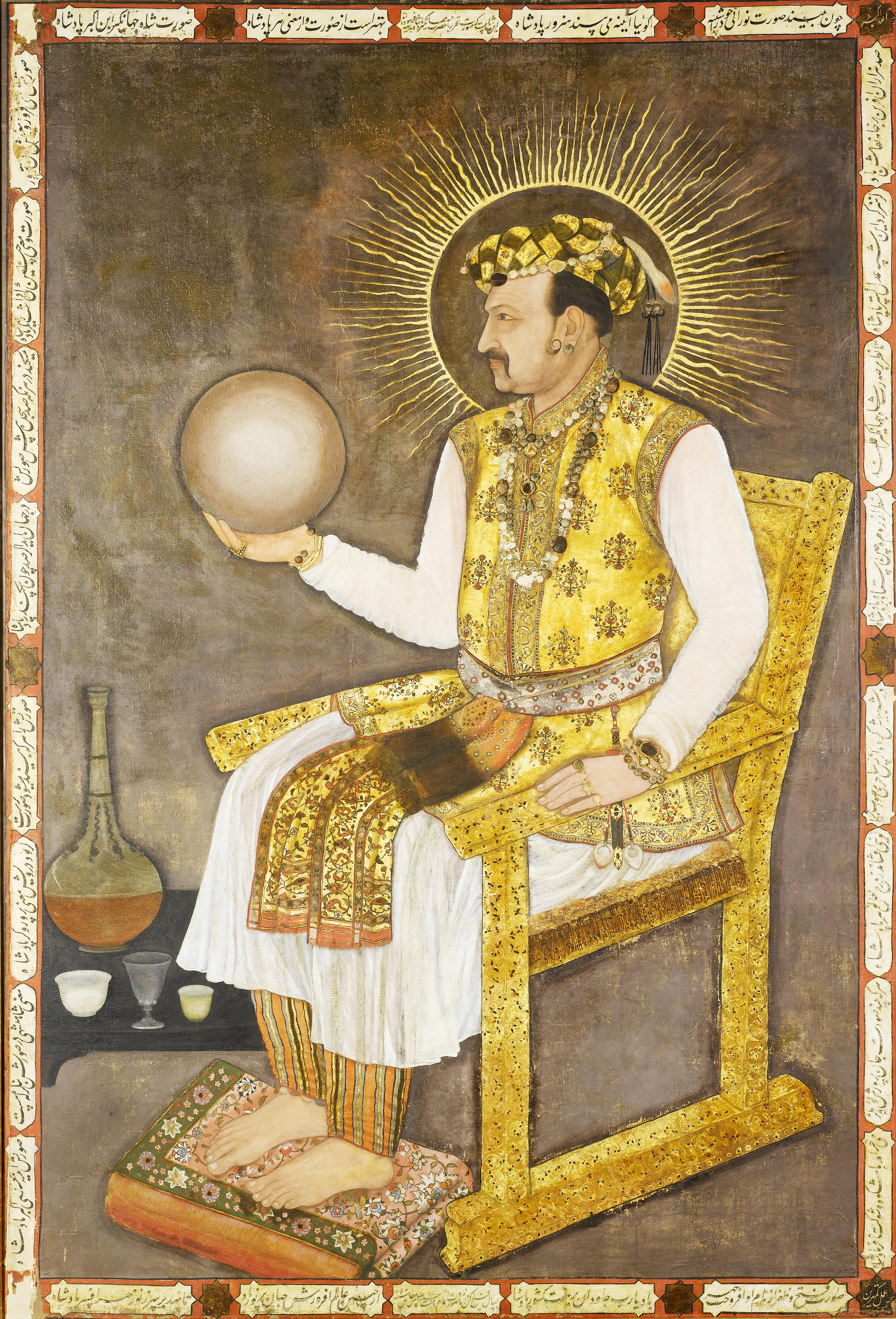
A detailed portrait of the Mughal Emperor Jahangir holding a celestial globe by Abul Hasan (dated 1617 AD)

A 17th-century celestial globe was made by Diya' ad-din Muhammad in Lahore, 1668 (now in Pakistan). It is now housed at the National Museum of Scotland. It is encircled by a meridian ring and a horizon ring. The latitude angle of 32° indicates that the globe was made in the Lahore workshop. This specific "workshop claims 21 signed globes—the largest number from a single shop" making this globe a good example of celestial globe production at its peak. The globe itself has been manufactured in one piece, so as to be seamless.

There are grooves which encircle the surface of the globe that create 12 sections of 30° which pass through the ecliptic poles. While they are no longer used in astronomy today, they are called "ecliptic latitude circles" and help astronomers of the Arabic and Greek worlds find the co-ordinates of a particular star. Each of the 12 sections corresponds to a house in the zodiac.

== See also ==
- Armillary sphere
- Celestial sphere
- De sphaera mundi
