= Farnese Atlas =

Ancient Roman statue of Greek Deity

Coordinates: 40.8534°N 14.2505°E

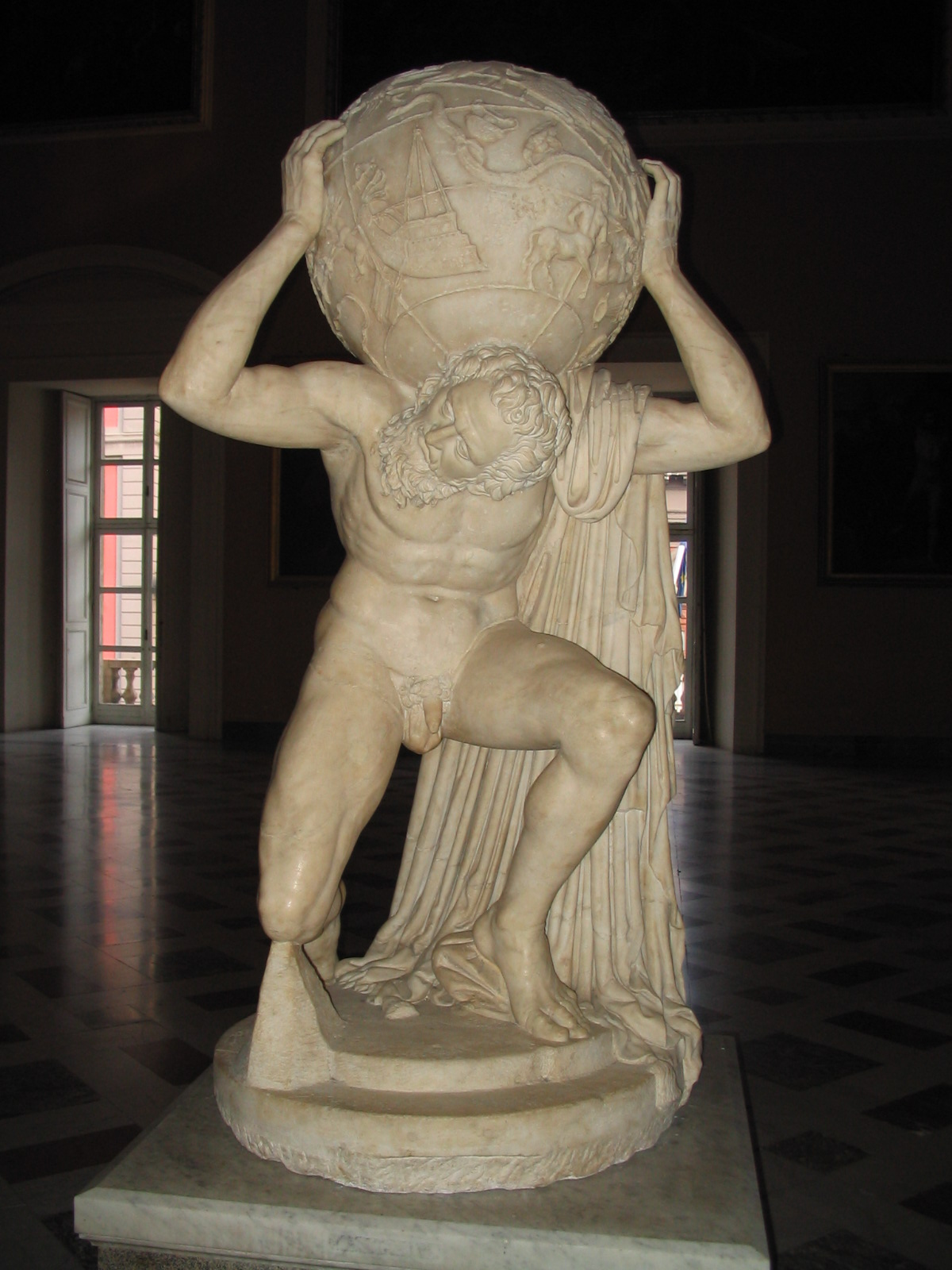
Farnese Atlas (Museo Archeologico Nazionale, Naples)

The Farnese Atlas is a 2nd-century CE Roman marble sculpture of Atlas holding up a celestial globe. Probably a copy of an earlier work of the Hellenistic period, it is the oldest extant statue of Atlas, a Titan of Greek mythology who is represented in earlier Greek vase painting, and the oldest known representation of the celestial sphere and the classical constellations. The sculpture is currently located at the National Archaeological Museum of Naples in Italy.

The statue is dated around CE 150, during the Roman Empire and after the composition of the Almagest by Claudius Ptolemy, but the celestial globe has long been presumed to represent constellations mapped in earlier Hellenistic astrology, particularly in the work of Hipparchus in the 2nd century BCE.

Atlas labors under the weight because he had been sentenced by Zeus to hold up the sky. The sphere shows a depiction of the night sky as seen from outside the outermost celestial sphere, with low reliefs depicting 41 (some sources say 42) of the 48 classical Greek constellations distinguished by Ptolemy, including Aries the ram, Cygnus the swan and Hercules the hero. The sculpture stands 2.1 meters (7 feet) tall, and the sphere is 65 centimeters (26 inches) in diameter.

The name Farnese Atlas reflects its acquisition by Cardinal Alessandro Farnese in 1562, and its subsequent exhibition in the Villa Farnese.

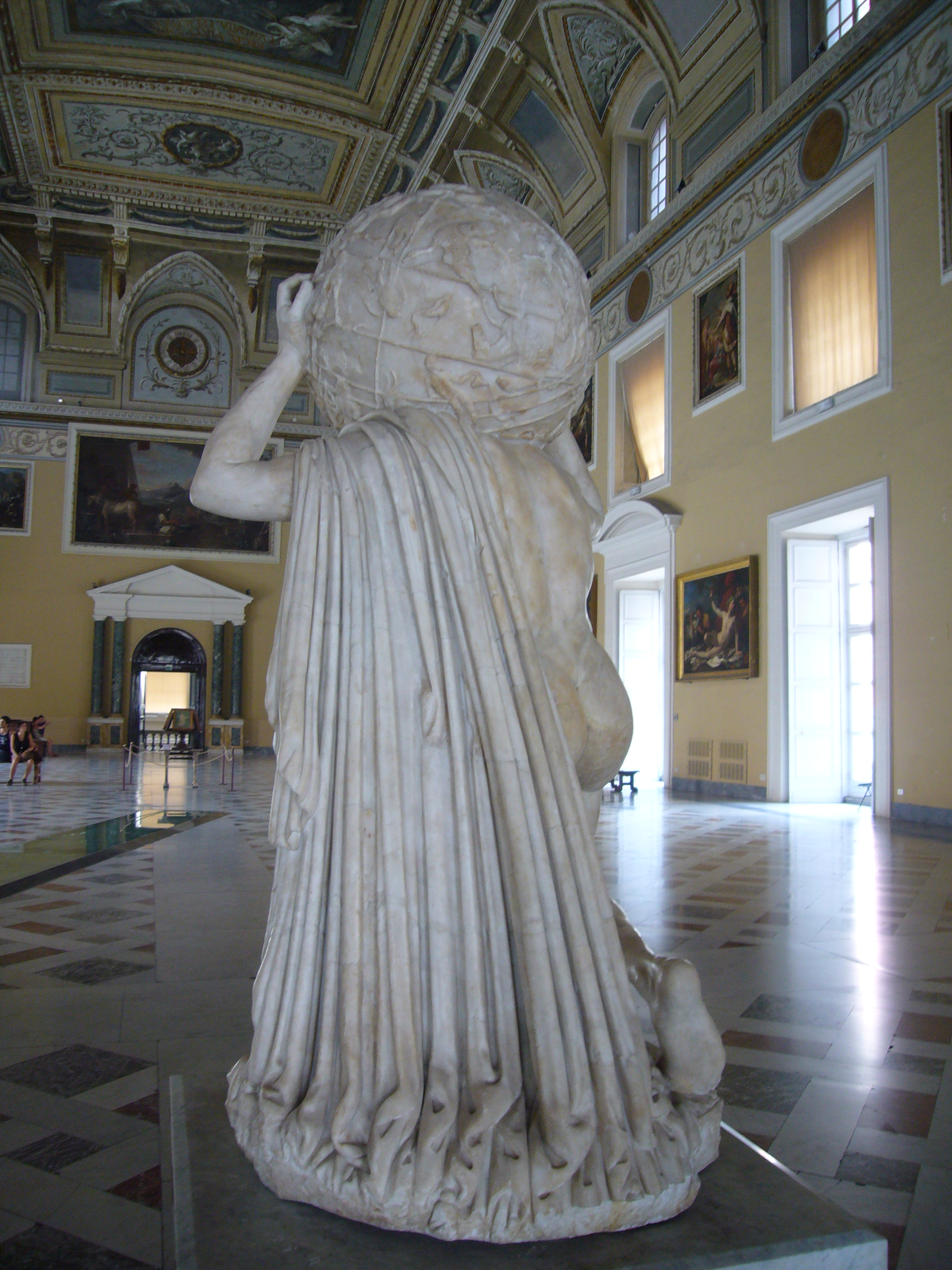
Rear view

== Dating the original ==
In 2005, at a meeting of the American Astronomical Society in San Diego, California, Bradley E. Schaefer, a professor of physics at Louisiana State University, presented a widely reported analysis concluding that the text of Hipparchus' long lost star catalog may have been the inspiration for the representation of the constellations on the globe, thereby reviving and expanding an earlier proposal by Georg Thiele (1898). The constellations are fairly detailed and Schaefer regards them as scientifically accurate given the period of the globe's creation, implying that it was modeled after a scholarly work. His statistical analysis concludes that the positions of these constellations are consistent with where they would have appeared in the time of Hipparchus (129 BCE) – leading to the conclusion that the statue is based on the star catalog.

However, because the globe contains no actual stars, and because the circles on the globe are drawn inexactly and ambiguously by a sculptor copying the Hellenistic model rather than by a modern astronomer, the dating of the globe is still uncertain and its source or sources remain controversial; Schaefer's conclusions have been strongly contested (e.g. by Dennis Duke) most particularly on the ground that regardless of the globe's date the constellations on it show large disagreements with the only existing work by Hipparchus.

== See also ==
- Dendera zodiac - an Egyptian bas-relief depicting constellations
- Globe
- Celestial cartography
- Celestial sphere
- Celestial spheres
- Early world maps
- Zodiac synagogue mosaic
