= Process layout =

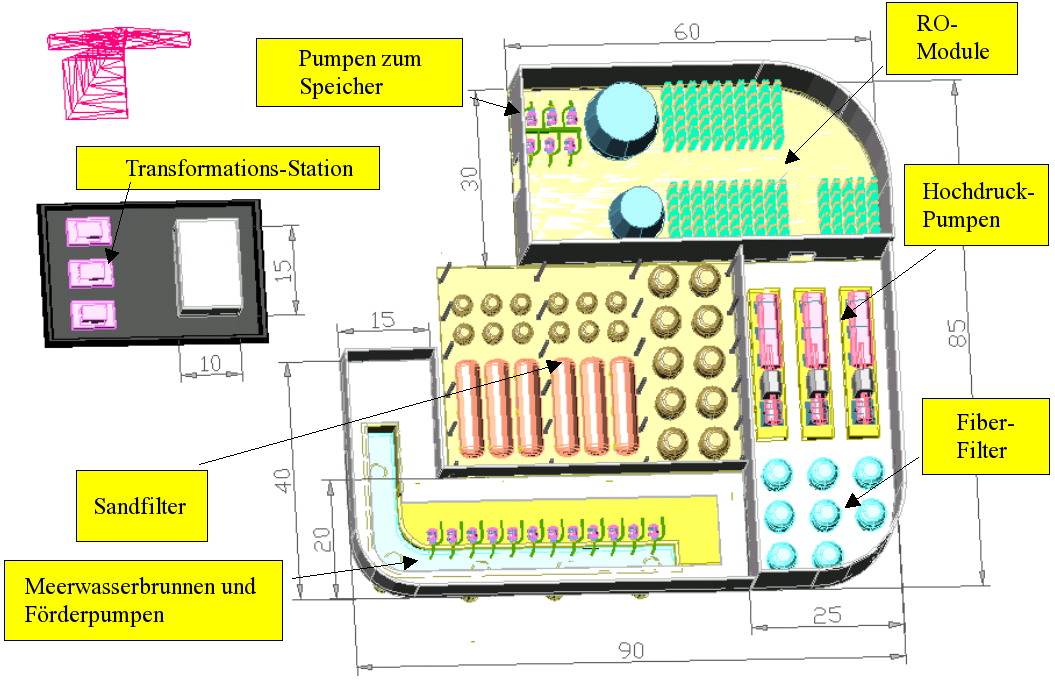
Typical plant layout, done through CAD. Note that layout for a production system reflects a conceived organisation of resources to achieve a certain goal, besides satisfying certain space constraints.

In manufacturing engineering, process layout is a design for the floor plan of a plant which aims to improve efficiency by arranging equipment according to its function. The production line should ideally be designed to eliminate waste in material flows, inventory handling and management. In process layout, the work stations and machinery are not arranged according to a particular production sequence. Instead, there is an assembly of similar operations or similar machinery in each department (for example, a drill department, a paint department, etc.)

It is also known as function layout. In this layout, machining operations are performed in group together and are not arranged according to any sequence.

== Main advantages ==
1. Provide visual control of activities
2. Use space efficiently
3. Eliminate bottlenecks
4. Facilitate communication and interaction between workers and supervisors
5. It is environmental friendly

== Criticism ==
A common criticism of this layout is that the work can be monotonous for staff, especially if they are involved only in one stage of the process. This criticism can however be eliminated if the staff are rotated to different departments (involving different processes) thus developing a multi-skilled body of staff.

== See also ==
- Product layout
