= Standard model (disambiguation) =

Standard model may refer to:

- Standard Model of particle physics
- The mathematical formulation of the Standard Model of particle physics
- The Standard Solar Model of solar astrophysics
- The Lambda-CDM model, the standard model of big bang cosmology
- Standard model (cryptography)
- Intended interpretation of a syntactical system, called standard model in mathematical logic
- The standard models of set theory
- The Standard Model (Exhibition) held in Stockholm, 2009

== See also ==
- Cosmological model
- The Standardmodell rifle, a German weapon
