= Product layout =

In manufacturing engineering, a product layout refers to a production system where the work stations and equipment are located along the line of production, as with assembly lines.

Usually, work units are moved along line (not necessarily a geometric line, but a set of interconnected work stations) by a conveyor. Work is done in small amounts at each of the work stations on the line. To use the product layout, the total work to be performed must be dividable into small tasks that can be assigned to each of the workstations.

Because the work stations each do small amounts of work, the stations utilize specific techniques and equipment tailored to the individual job they are assigned. This can lead to a higher production rate.

== See also ==
- Process layout
