= Ibrahim ibn Said al-Sahli =

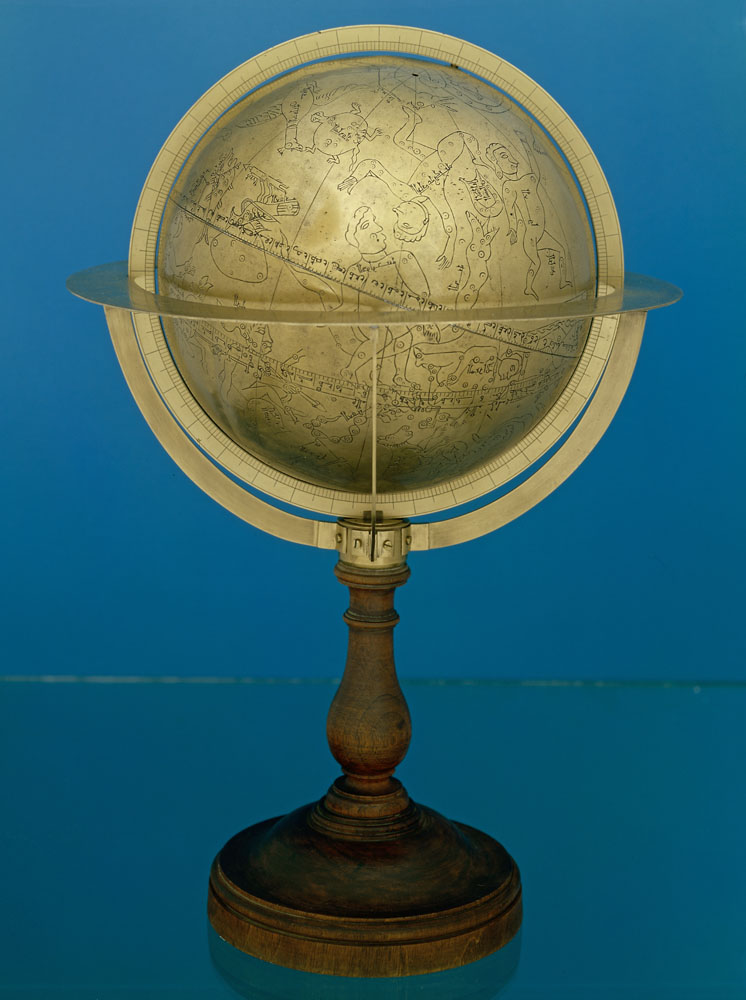
Astrolabe from Said al-Sahli in Museo Galileo, Florence.

Ibrahim Ibn Saîd al-Sahlì (Arabic: إبراهيم بن سعيد السهلي) (11th century) was an Andalusian globe-maker, active from 1050 to 1090.

Ibrahim Ibn Saîd al-Sahlì worked in Valencia and Toledo in what is now Spain, and was mentioned in a list of mathematics students in Andalusia in a book written in 1068. Ibrahim Ibn Saîd al-Sahlì created the "astrolabe of Al-Sahli", an instrument to determine the positions of the stars on the sky, in the city of Tulaytulah (now Toledo, Spain) in the year 1066. He built four more astrolabes between 1067 and 1086. His first astrolabe was characterized by the peculiarity of its operation, as other astrolabes made in his time were not similar.
