= List of individual body parts =

There have been historical instances of specific, individual organs and appendages being famous in their own regard. Many noted body parts are of dubious provenance and most were separated from their bodies post-mortem.

In some faiths, veneration of the dead may include the preservation of body parts as relics. Body parts supposed to belong to major religious figures are kept in temples, including the tooth of the Buddha, Muhammad's beard, and Jesus's foreskin. Preservation of body parts is particularly popular within the Roman Catholic Church, where the relics are often housed in reliquaries and lipsanothecae.

In the West, a cult of relics emerged in the Middle Ages and most body parts preserved prior to the Age of Enlightenment belonged to saints. Heart-burial (burying the heart separately from the body) was not uncommon for the elite in medieval Europe. In the 19th century, the pseudoscience of phrenology led to an increased interest in heads and skulls. As preservation methods and the anatomical sciences developed, parts of scientists were increasingly preserved, especially brains.

Body parts removed from people have been used for research or put on display in museums and churches. Noted body parts include the lost limbs of soldiers, such as Lord Uxbridge's leg or Stonewall Jackson's arm, as well as the heads and brains of criminals.

== Table of body parts ==
This list excludes fossils, archaeological discoveries, and body parts of living people.

Description	Person	Location or fate	Body part	Details
Head of Diogo Alves	Diogo Alves	University of Lisbon's Faculty of Medicine	Head	Portuguese serial killer Diogo Alves was executed in 1841. His head was removed from his body and sent to the Medical-Surgical School of Lisbon to be studied by phrenologists. Alves's head has been displayed in exhibitions and is kept at the anatomical theatre of the University of Lisbon's Faculty of Medicine. The head resides in a glass jar, submerged in a formaldehyde solution. His eyes were removed and replaced with glass eyes.
Tongue of St. Anthony	Anthony of Padua	Basilica of Saint Anthony of Padua	Tongue	Anthony died in 1231. His body was transferred to a larger church in 1263 and Bonaventure removed the chin and tongue. A reliquary was carved for the jaw in 1350. The chin and tongue are kept in a gold reliquary in the Basilica of Saint Anthony of Padua.
Arm of Thomas Aquinas	Thomas Aquinas	San Domenico Maggiore	Arm	Thomas Aquinas died in 1274. Following his canonization in 1363, his bones were relocated to the Dominican Church of Toulouse. His head is thought to rest in the cathedral of Priverno in Latium. A fragment from Aquinas's left arm bone is kept as a relic by San Domenico Maggiore in Naples. The arm bone fragment is preserved within a bronze and silver arm-shaped reliquary as part of the Sacred Relics Chamber of the church.
Charles Babbage's brain	Charles Babbage	Hunterian Museum, London ---- Science Museum, London	Brain	Charles Babbage (1791–1871) wanted his brain donated to science. Half of his brain is preserved in the Royal College of Surgeons Hunterian Museum and the other half is at Science Museum, London.
Beethoven's ear bones	Ludwig van Beethoven	Lost	Ear bones (ossicles)	During Beethoven's autopsy, pathologist Johann Wagner sawed Beethoven's skull open and cut out his temporal bones. When his body was exhumed in 1863, the temporal bones and six of his teeth were missing. His skull was in nine pieces. Some fragments were taken before the body was reinterred. They were later found to be held by Franz Romeo Seligmann.
Beethoven's hair	Ludwig van Beethoven	New York Public Library	Hair	Following Beethoven's death in 1827, his admirers and friends took locks of hair from his head as mementos. According to a 2023 paper, at least five authentic locks of his hair exist in public and private collections. Analyses of the hair determined that Beethoven had high levels of lead and arsenic and that he was predisposed to liver disease, had Hepatitis B, and at least one member of his direct paternal line had an extramarital affair.
Jeremy Bentham's head	Jeremy Bentham	University College London	Head	Philosopher Jeremy Bentham died in 1832 and left instructions for his body to be dissected and permanently preserved as an "auto-icon" (or self-image), which would be his memorial. Bentham wanted his head to be preserved in the style of the Māori, and Thomas Southwood Smith created the auto-icon. Finding it unsuitable for display, he commissioned a wax replica of the head. The auto-icon is now on public display at the entrance of the Student Centre at University College London. After Bentham's head was stolen by students from King's College London in the 1990s, it was removed from display.
Leg of Sarah Bernhardt	Sarah Bernhardt	Lost	Leg	French actress Sarah Bernhardt twisted her right knee during a 1904 production of Tosca. She experienced pain which worsened in 1914 and she couldn't put any weight on it. After trying a plaster cast for six months, she wrote to her physician, Samuel Jean Pozzi, asking that he amputate her leg above the knee. On 22 February 1915, the leg was amputated above the knee with an anterior flap. The leg was taken to the Faculty of Medicine in Bordeaux for a pathological examination. French newspaper Sud Ouest reported that Bernhardt's leg had been found in the Faculty's basement in 2008, only to produce a left leg that had been amputated below the knee. The whereabouts of her leg are unknown.
Heart of André Bessette	André Bessette	Saint Joseph's Oratory	Heart	The remains of Bessette lie in Saint Joseph's Oratory, the church he helped build. His body lies in a tomb built below the Oratory's Main Chapel, except for his heart, which is preserved in a reliquary in the same Oratory. The heart was stolen in March 1973, but was recovered in December 1974 with the help of criminal lawyer Frank Shoofey.
Heart of Anne Boleyn	Anne Boleyn	St. Mary's church, Erwarton	Heart	A lead, heart-shaped box was discovered in the chancel wall of St Mary's church in Erwarton in 1837. The box contained dust and was reburied beneath the church organ in 1838. A church in Norfolk also lays claim to being the location of Boleyn's remains.
Arm of Saint Bonaventure	Bonaventure	Cattedrale San Bonaventura	Arm	The braccio santo or holy arm of Bonaventure has been kept as a relic by the Cattedrale San Bonaventura in a chapel to the right of the church's nave since it was brought there in 1491. The only extant relic of Bonaventure is the right arm and hand with which he wrote his Commentary on the Sentences, which is now conserved at Bagnoregio, in the Cathedral of San Nicola and San Donato. It is kept in a silver, arm-shaped reliquary.
Head of Badu Bonsu II	Badu Bonsu II	Ghana	Head	After Badu Bonsu II was captured and executed in 1838, a Dutch surgeon removed his head. The head was taken to the Netherlands, examined by a phrenologist, and then lost for over 100 years. In 2002, the head, preserved in a jar with formaldehyde, was discovered in the cupboard of a laboratory of the Leiden University Medical Center by novelist Arthur Japin. Bonsu's head was returned to Ghana in 2009.
Vertebrae of John Wilkes Booth	John Wilkes Booth	National Museum of Health and Medicine	Vertebrae	John Wilkes Booth, the assassin of Abraham Lincoln, died in 1865. Following an autopsy, three of his cervical vertebrae were retained by the US Army. The remainder of his body was buried in Green Mount Cemetery in Baltimore. The vertebrae are kept at the National Museum of Health and Medicine. A 2013 request to conduct a test on the vertebrae comparing Booth's DNA to that of his brother Edwin was rejected by the U.S. Army Medical Command, which cited "the need to preserve these bones for future generations".
Broca's brain	Paul Broca	Musée de l'Homme	Brain	The French anatomist Paul Broca, for whom Broca's area in the frontal lobe of the brain is named, died in 1880. His own brain became part of the collection of brains held by the Musée de l'Homme. Carl Sagan wrote about holding the brain in his hands in his 1979 book Broca's Brain. The brain is kept in a low cylindrical bottle, fragmented, and preserved in formalin.
Tooth of the Buddha	Buddha	Relic of the tooth of the Buddha at the Sacred Tooth Temple; Sri Lanka	Teeth	Siddhartha Gautama died in the 5th century BCE and was cremated. As of 2024, 32 museums and temples claim to hold one or more teeth of the Buddha. A tooth is venerated as a cetiya relic in Sri Lanka, at the Relic of the tooth of the Buddha in the Temple of the Tooth. Another tooth is kept at the Buddha Tooth Relic Temple and Museum in Singapore.
Skin of William Burke (calling card case depicted)	William Burke	Various locations	Skin	Serial killer William Burke of the Burke and Hare murders would smother his victims and then sell their bodies to an anatomist. Following his execution in 1829, he was publicly dissected. His skin was said to have been tanned and sold as a souvenir at a shilling per inch, then made into wallets and tobacco pouches. His skeleton is in the University of Edinburgh's Anatomy Museum.
Catherine of Siena's head	Catherine of Siena	Basilica of San Domenico, Siena	Head	Catherine died in 1380. The following year, Pope Urban VI ordered that her head be removed from her body and given to the people of Siena. It was kept in a cupboard for four years before being displayed in the center of the chapel of the Basilica of San Domenico. Her finger is also kept in the Basilica alongside the cords she used to discipline herself.
Chopin's heart	Frédéric Chopin	Holy Cross Church	Heart	Polish composer Frédéric Chopin died in 1849 at the age of 39. His heart was removed from his corpse, immersed in alcohol, and smuggled into Poland by his sister. It was given to Warsaw's Holy Cross Church and lay in the catacombs for years, until a journalist discovered it and it was transferred to the upper part of the church in 1879. During World War II, Nazis took possession of his heart, which was kept by the SS. It was returned and hidden in Milanowek, before being transferred back to the Holy Cross Church in a grand procession. It is interred in a pillar in the church in Warsaw.
Nervous system of Harriet Cole	Harriet Cole	Drexel University College of Medicine	Nervous system	In 1888, anatomist Rufus B. Weaver of the Hahnemann Medical College extracted and mounted a complete cerebrospinal nervous system. The nervous system is thought to belong to Harriet Cole, a black woman who was a custodian at the college and died of tuberculosis at around the age of 35. Weaver spent five months dissecting her body, wrapping the nerves in gauze before coating the strands with white paint and shellack. The finished nervous system was exhibited at the 1893 World's Columbian Exposition in Chicago where it received the blue-ribbon Premium Scientific Award.
Oliver Cromwell's head	Oliver Cromwell	Sidney Sussex College	Head	Oliver Cromwell died in 1658. Charles II had Cromwell's body disinterred, hung and decapitated in 1661. The head was impaled on a pole at Westminster Hall until 1684. It was lost for years before being sold to Claudius Du Puy, who had a "museum of freaks and curiosities". The head passed to various private collectors and museums until 1960, when it was buried at Sidney Sussex College in Cambridge.
Isaac Ebey's scalp	Isaac Ebey	Lost	Scalp	In 1857, Native Americans killed Isaac Ebey and cut off his head. His scalp, including the attached hair and ears, was separated from his skull. Captain Charles Dodd recovered the scalp, trading "six blankets, 3 pipes, 1 cotton handkerchief, 6 heads of tobacco, 1 fthm. cotton," for it. The scalp was returned to Port Townsend and Isaac's brother. It remained in the Ebey family until the early 20th century. There is no record of the scalp after 1914.
Thomas Edison's last breath	Thomas Edison	The Henry Ford	Breath	A test tube purporting to hold Thomas Edison's last breath is in The Henry Ford museum near Detroit. Henry Ford reportedly convinced Edison's son Charles to seal a test tube of air in the inventor's room shortly after his death, as a memento. Charles wrote in 1953 that there were eight empty test tubes in the room near Edison when he was dying. He had the physician seal them with paraffin. The director of the Edison and Ford Winter Estates indicated in 1999 that they held 42 test tubes all supposedly holding Edison's last breath.
Brain of Albert Einstein	Albert Einstein	National Museum of Health and Medicine; Mütter Museum	Brain	After Albert Einstein died in 1955, his brain was removed during autopsy by Thomas Stoltz Harvey. Harvey dissected the brain into about 240 blocks, keeping some for himself and giving some to other pathologists. Harvey's heirs donated the remaining pieces of Einstein's brain to the National Museum of Health and Medicine in 2010. The Mütter Museum in Philadelphia acquired 46 pieces of Einstein's brain and exhibited some of them in 2013.
Eyes of Albert Einstein	Albert Einstein	New York safe deposit box	Eyes	Einstein's eyes were removed during autopsy and given to his ophthalmologist, Henry Abrams. They are rumoured to be in a New York safe deposit box.
Galileo's middle finger	Galileo Galilei	Museo Galileo	Middle finger	Galileo's corpse was disinterred 95 years after his death. His remains were transferred to a mausoleum at the Basilica di Santa Croce in Florence. Antiquarian Anton Francesco Gori, anatomist Antonio Cocchi, and Italian marquis Vincenzio Capponi removed the middle finger of Galileo's right hand as well as one of his vertebrae, an index finger, a thumb, and a tooth. The middle finger is displayed at the Museo Galileo.
Vertebrae of James A. Garfield	James A. Garfield	National Museum of Health and Medicine	Vertebrae	US president James A. Garfield was shot twice by Charles Guiteau in 1881, with the second bullet striking his vertebrae. Physicians were unable to locate the bullet, even with the help of an early metal detector of Alexander Graham Bell. Garfield's vertebrae were exhibited by the National Museum of Health and Medicine in 2000.
Brain of Carl Gauss	Carl Gauss	University Medical Center Göttingen	Brain	Following Carl Gauss's death in 1855, his brain was removed and studied by Rudolf Wagner. In 2013 it was discovered that his brain had been switched with that of Conrad Heinrich Fuchs, who died the same year as Gauss. The brains are kept by the Institute of Ethics and History of Medicine at the University Medical Center Göttingen.
Geronimo's skull	Geronimo	Disputed	Skull	Apache leader Geronimo died in 1909 at Fort Sill, Oklahoma, where he was buried. His skull was allegedly stolen by members of the Yale secret society Skull and Bones. A 1918 correspondence between two Skull and Bones members refers to the theft. Descendents of Geronimo sued Yale University and Skull and Bones for the recovery of the remains. A federal judge dismissed the lawsuit.
Che Guevara's hair	Che Guevara	Collection of Bill Butler	Hair	A lock of Guevara's hair appeared at auction in 2007. It was purchased by Texas bookstore owner Bill Burton for $100,000.
Hands of Che Guevara	Che Guevara	Lost	Hand	After Che Guevara was executed by US-trained Bolivian soldiers in 1967, his hands were cut off under orders from a CIA operative. Argentine law enforcement officials conducted a fingerprint analysis of the hands that was sent to Washington, DC. Guevara's body was discovered in Villegrande, Bolivia, in 1997, without his hands. His hands are rumored to have been taken to Cuba. The search for his hands is the subject of the 2005 documentary film The Hands of Che Guevara.
Charles Guiteau's brain	Charles J. Guiteau	Mütter Museum	Brain	After Charles Guiteau was hanged for assassinating U.S. president James A. Garfield, he was autopsied and buried. His remains were disinterred and sent to the National Museum of Health and Medicine in Maryland, which preserved his brain, spleen, and skeleton before placing them in storage. Parts of Guiteau's brain are on display in a jar at the Mütter Museum in Philadelphia.
Mata Hari's head	Mata Hari	Lost	Head	After the spy Mata Hari was executed by firing squad, her head was removed, embalmed, and sent to the Museum of Anatomy in Paris. In 2000, archivists discovered that it had disappeared, possibly as early as 1954, during the museum's relocation. Her head remains missing.
Haydn's skull	Joseph Haydn	Bergkirche	Skull	Days after Joseph Haydn's burial in 1809, his body was disinterred by gravedigger Jakob Demuth. The head was acquired by Joseph Carl Rosenbaum and Johann Nepomuk Peter, who had an interest in phrenology. The skull was bleached and displayed in the home of Peter for a time before passing to Rosenbaum. Haydn's body was exhumed over a decade later under the direction of Nikolaus II, Prince Esterházy, when it was discovered that his head was missing. Rosenbaum and Peter were suspected of the theft, but hid the skull and produced two other skulls that they claimed were Haydn's. The true skull was passed to a physician and a professor before being gifted to Vienna's Gesellschaft der Musikfreunde (Society of the Friends of Music) in 1895. The skull was reunited with Haydn's body at a tomb in the Bergkirche in Eisenstadt in 1932. It shares the tomb with another substitute skull.
Hand of St James the Apostle	James the Great	St Peter's Church, Marlow	Hand	A hand that is purported to belong to St James the Apostle was brought to England by Empress Matilda in the 12th century. In 1539 at the Dissolution of the Monasteries, English monks hid the hand in an iron chest in the walls of Reading Abbey. It was dug up again in 1786 by workmen and given to Reading Museum. In 1840 it was sold to J. Scott Murray, who put it in his private chapel at Danesfield House. On his death in 1882 he gave it to St. Peter's Church in Great Marlow (now Marlow).
Jimi Hendrix's penis	Jimi Hendrix	Buried in the Greenwood Memorial Park; a plaster cast is on display in the Icelandic Phallological Museum	Penis	Jimi Hendrix was the first celebrity to be cast by Cynthia Plaster Caster, an artist known for lifecasting celebrity penises. Hendrix's cast was created while he was touring in Chicago in 1968. Cynthia Plaster Caster donated the cast to the Icelandic Phallological Museum shortly before her death in April 2022.
Head of Henry IV	Henry IV	Disputed	Head	After Henry IV's assassination in 1610, he was interred at the chapel at Saint-Denis. A mob later ransacked the chapel and a head, purportedly that of the late king, was taken and passed through the hands of several collectors. Later research cast doubt on the identification of the head's owner.
Joe Hill's ashes	Joe Hill	Scattered in locations around the world; some were consumed by Billy Bragg and Otis Gibbs	Cremated remains	After Joe Hill was executed, the Industrial Workers of the World distributed packets of his cremated remains to delegates across Europe, Asia, Australia, New Zealand, South America, and South Africa to be scattered. Other packets were sent to chapters in the United States. After a federal crackdown of the IWW, a packet was seized from Chicago by the Bureau of Investigation before being transferred to the National Archives and Records Administration in 1944. The packet was returned to the IWW in 1988. On the suggestion of radical activist Abbie Hoffman, the British folk musician Billy Bragg consumed some of the ashes in honor of Hill, later giving an additional packet to American folk singer Otis Gibbs to do the same.
Hitler's testicle	Adolf Hitler	Destroyed	Testicle	Adolf Hitler was rumoured to have one testicle, inspiring the song "Hitler Has Only Got One Ball". Medical records indicate that he may have had an undescended right testicle (cryptorchidism). Hitler was also thought to have had hypospadias.
Hitler's jawbone	Adolf Hitler	Russian state archives	Jawbone	After Hitler killed himself, his body was burned. Soviet soldiers discovered the remains of his charred body in a bomb crater. A part of his skull and a portion of his jawbone were taken to Moscow and were stored in the state archives. A team of French pathologists confirmed the authenticity of the jawbone in 2017.
Saddam Hussein's blood	Saddam Hussein	Umm al-Qura Mosque	Blood	In 1997, Saddam Hussein commissioned a manuscript of the Quran to be written using his blood. The manuscript, known as the Blood Quran, was displayed at the Umm al-Qura Mosque but condemned by religious authorities in the United Arab Emirates and Saudi Arabia. There has been doubt as to whether all of the blood really belonged to Saddam Hussein, as the manuscript used 27 liters of blood, supposedly taken from Hussein in a two-year period, which could have caused serious health complications. After Hussein's fall from power, the Quran was removed from display and put into the mosque's basement for safekeeping.
Stonewall Jackson's arm	Stonewall Jackson	Ellwood Manor	Arm	After being accidentally shot by his own troops, Stonewall Jackson's left arm was amputated. It was buried in a cemetery at Ellwood Manor. Union soldiers were said to have dug up the arm and reburied it in 1864. A marker reading "Arm of Stonewall Jackson May 3, 1863." was erected for the arm in 1903.
Blood of St. Januarius	Januarius	Naples Cathedral	Blood	Ampoules that are said to contain the blood of Januarius are kept in a bank vault in Naples. During the Feast of San Gennaro, and two other times during the year, the ampoules are removed, when the blood is said to sometimes miraculously liquify. The blood is displayed at Naples Cathedral for veneration following the feast day.
Holy Prepuce (foreskin of Jesus)	Jesus	Disputed	Foreskin	Jesus is presumed to have been circumcised in accordance with Jewish law. A number of churches have claimed to have his foreskin or "holy prepuce". During the Middle Ages, anywhere from eight to 18 European towns claimed to possess the holy foreskin. The Italian village of Calcata claimed to possess the foreskin from 1557. An annual procession featuring the relic ended in 1983 when the foreskin was stolen.
Robert Jenkin's ear	Robert Jenkins	Lost	Ear	In April 1731, the ship of Robert Jenkins was searched for contraband by Spanish coast guards. Part of his left ear was allegedly severed by a cutlass. Jenkins kept the ear in a box for eight years. The following War of Jenkins' Ear was named for the ear.
Head of John the Baptist	John the Baptist	Disputed	Head	John the Baptist was beheaded according to Christian tradition. Multiple churches and a mosque claim to be in possession of the head. The Amiens Cathedral in France as well as San Silvestro in Capite claim to house the head. The Umayyad Mosque in Damascus claims to have the head in a shrine. The Residenz Museum in Munich claims to hold the head in a reliquary.
Kennedy's brain	John F. Kennedy	Lost	Brain	During the autopsy of John F. Kennedy his brain was removed and preserved in formaldehyde. The right hemisphere was macerated due to the bullet that went through it. The brain was stored with the National Archives, but was found to be missing in 1966.
Skeleton of Grover Krantz	Grover Krantz	National Museum of Natural History	Bones	Following his death, anthropologist and Bigfoot scholar Grover Krantz bequeathed his body to the Smithsonian on the condition that his pet Irish Wolfhounds be kept with his remains. His body was shipped to the body farm at the University of Tennessee Anthropological Research Facility and later went to the Smithsonian's National Museum of Natural History. His skeleton was re-articulated in 2009 and put on display in the museum's Written in Bone: Forensic Files of the 17th Century Chesapeake exhibition along with the skeleton of his dog Clyde.
Scrotum of King Billy	William Lanne	Unknown	Scrotum	After the Aboriginal Tasmanian man William Lanne ("King Billy") died in 1869, his scrotum was removed and tailored into a tobacco pouch. His head was sent to London's Royal College of Surgeons.
Lenin's brain	Vladimir Lenin	Russian state archives	Brain	Lenin's brain and other organs were removed prior to his mummification. It was cut into over 30,000 pieces. German neurologist and psychiatrist Oskar Vogt conducted an anatomical study of Lenin's brain.
Skull fragments of Abraham Lincoln	Abraham Lincoln	National Museum of Health and Medicine	Skull	Following his assassination, the skull fragments of Abraham Lincoln were preserved after autopsy and were presented as evidence to the Judge Advocate General of the War Department. They are preserved in the National Museum of Health and Medicine.
Sourtoe	Louie Linken	Downtown Hotel; Dawson City, Yukon	Toe	According to the legend, in the 1920s the frostbitten and gangrenous big toe of rumrunner Louie Linken was amputated with an ax by his brother Otto. The toe was preserved in alcohol and forgotten until its rediscovery by Captain Dick Stevenson in 1973 who devised a Sourtoe Cocktail Club whose members had imbibed a cocktail containing the toe. The toe was used in the 'Sourtoe cocktail' at the Downtown Hotel in Dawson City, Yukon. At some point, the original toe was replaced. The toes used for the cocktails generally last about five years. As of 2019, 10 distinct toes were being used. One of the toes was swallowed by an American in 2013, after which the fine for swallowing the toe was increased from C$500 to C$2500. Another toe, donated by a man who had his surgically removed and brined in salt for six months, was stolen in 2017.
Heart of Louis XIV	Louis XIV	Eaten, made into paint	Heart	The heart of Louis XIV was removed from his body shortly after he died and kept in a church in Paris. During the French Revolution in 1789, it was stolen by the architect Louis François Petit-Radel. He is said to have sold fragments of the heart to the painters, who ground it up to make the pigment mummy brown. The painters Martin Drolling and Alexandre Pau de Saint-Martin have been rumoured to have used the pigment in their works. The rest of Louis XIV's heart was mummified. A portion of his mummified heart was kept in a silver locket by the Harcourt family. During a formal dinner in 1848, William Buckland ate the heart.
Mozart's skull	Wolfgang Amadeus Mozart	International Mozarteum Foundation	Skull	According to legend, gravedigger Joseph Rothmayer removed Mozart from his unmarked Vienna grave in 1801. The skull, apart from the jawbone, passed to Rothmayer's descendants before coming into the possession of the International Mozarteum Foundation in 1902. Forensic analysis of the skull has been inconclusive, with the skull not matching the DNA of bodies that had been thought to belong to his grandmother and niece.
Beard of Muhammad	Muhammad	Mevlâna mausoleum Topkapı Palace	Beard	The Sakal-ı Şerif or beard of Muhammad and the Dendan-ı Saadet, a portion of his tooth, are among the relics of Muhammad that have been exhibited alongside other Sacred Relics in Topkapı Palace in the Chamber of the Holy Relics.
Head of Joaquin Murrieta	Joaquin Murrieta	Destroyed	Head	The Mexican "Robin Hood" Joaquin Murrieta was allegedly killed in 1853. While there were rumors that he escaped to Mexico, a severed head purported to belong to Murrieta was pickled in alcohol and presented for a $6000 reward. The head was taken to mining camps where it was exhibited, admission costing $1. It was exhibited for 40 years at Dr. Jordan's San Francisco Museum and was destroyed during the 1906 San Francisco earthquake.
Mussolini's brain	Benito Mussolini	Destroyed	Brain	In 1966, Mussolini's brain tissue samples, taken at the autopsy, were returned to his widow by St. Elizabeths psychiatric hospital in Washington DC, where they had been stored since 1945. She placed the samples in a box in the tomb, leading the historian John Foot to comment that "finally, after nineteen years after his execution, Benito Mussolini's mortal and restless remains were back in one place, and in more or less one piece". In 2009, it was reported that samples of Mussolini's brain and blood, stolen at the time of the autopsy, were offered for sale on eBay for 15,000 euros. eBay removed the listing shortly after it had been posted and no one had been able to bid. The hospital authorities said that all samples from the autopsy were destroyed in 1947.
Napoleon's penis	Napoleon	New Jersey	Penis	Following his death in 1821, Napoleon's penis was cut off for a keepsake. A priest brought it to Corsica and gave it to his family. It was sold in 1916 to a bookseller from the United Kingdom and again about eight years later to a bookseller from the United States. In 1927 it was displayed at the Museum of French Art as a tendon, where it was described as looking like a "maltreated strip of buckskin shoelace or a shriveled eel". In 1977, it was sold at auction for $3000 to urologist John K. Lattimer. Author Tony Perrottet described it as roughly 1.5 inches in length, looking "like a little baby's finger".
Bones of Thomas Paine	Thomas Paine	Lost	Bones	Following his death in 1809, Thomas Paine was buried beneath a walnut tree on his farm in New Rochelle, New York. In 1819, journalist William Cobbett disinterred Paine and took the corpse to England. Cobbett had intended to bury Paine's bones there, but when he died in 1835 they lay in a box. It is not known what became of them.
Pedro I's heart	Dom Pedro I	Church of Our Lady of Lapa	Heart	The heart of the Brazilian emperor Dom Pedro I was preserved following his death in 1834. It is kept in a glass jar, with formaldehyde, in the Church of Our Lady of Lapa. The container is locked inside an urn. The heart is considered a relic by the Portuguese government.
Hands of Perón	Juan Perón	Stolen	Hand	Argentine president Juan Perón died in 1974 and his body was later moved to a tomb at Chacarita Cemetery. In 1987, thieves broke into the tomb, stealing his cap and sword, and cutting off both of his hands. A ransom note demanded US$8 million for their return. The hands were never returned.
Rasputin's penis	Rasputin	Lost	Penis	Rasputin was assassinated in 1916. In the 1920s, a group of Russian émigrés to France claimed to possess his penis which legend held could grant fertility. His daughter Maria Rasputin is said to have taken possession of the member. American collector Michael Augustine claimed that he had purchased it at an estate sale in 1994. The Museum of Russian Erotica in St. Petersburg holds a 28.5 cm (11.2 in) specimen it claims belonged to Rasputin. Experts have said that the penis probably came from a bull or a horse.
Heart of Richard I	Richard I of England		Heart	The heart of Richard I of England (1157–1199) was separated from his body following his death. His body was entombed separately from his entrails, which were interred in Chalus, and his heart, which was embalmed and buried in the Rouen Cathedral. The small lead box was disinterred in a 19th-century excavation, which contained the remains of his heart, a greyish-brown powder. Analysis revealed that the heart had been wrapped in linen. Traces were discovered of frankincense, myrtle, mercury, mint, daisy, and potentially lime.
Remains of Richard III	Richard III of England	Leicester Cathedral	Bones	The remains of Richard III, the last English king killed in battle and last king of the House of York, were discovered within the site of the former Greyfriars Friary in Leicester, England, in September 2012. Following extensive anthropological and genetic testing, the remains were reinterred at Leicester Cathedral on 26 March 2015.
Vertebra of José Rizal	José Rizal	Rizal Shrine	Vertebra	The Filipino nationalist José Rizal was executed by firing squad in 1896. His vertebrae are held in a reliquary in the Rizal Shrine at Fort Santiago in Manila. One of the vertebra is chipped by one of the bullets that killed him.
Stomach of Alexis St. Martin	Alexis St. Martin	Saint-Thomas Parish Cemetery	Stomach	Alexis St. Martin was accidentally shot by a musket in 1822. His injuries included an opening into his stomach that would not close. Water and food could be placed in his stomach through the opening, or be drawn out with a syphon. The physician William Beaumont conducted a series of digestion experiments on St. Martin between 1822 and 1833.
Leg of Santa Anna	Antonio López de Santa Anna	Lost or destroyed	Leg	During the Pastry War in 1838, López de Santa Anna was struck by cannon fire in his left leg. His shattered ankle required amputation of much of his leg, which he ordered buried with full military honors. The leg was exhumed in 1842 and reburied in a state ceremony. Later in 1844, the leg was exhumed again and dragged in the streets. One of his artificial legs is in the collection of the Illinois State Military Museum.
Bones of Saint Nicholas	Saint Nicholas	Basilica di San Nicola	Bones	In 1087, while the Greek Christian inhabitants of the region were subjugated by the newly arrived Muslim Seljuk Turks, and soon after their church was declared to be in schism by the Catholic church, a group of merchants from the Italian city of Bari removed the major bones of Nicholas's skeleton from his sarcophagus in the church without authorization and brought them to their hometown, where they are now enshrined in the Basilica di San Nicola. The remaining bone fragments from the sarcophagus were later removed by Venetian sailors and taken to Venice during the First Crusade.
Head of Antonio Scarpa	Antonio Scarpa	University History Museum, University of Pavia	Head	After Antonio Scarpa's death in 1832, his assistant Carlo Beolchin and the naturalist Mauro Ruscóni removed his head and fingers during autopsy. His head was exhibited in the Institute of Anatomy. The head is still on display at the University History Museum of the University of Pavia.
Friedrich Schiller's skull	Friedrich Schiller	Lost	Skull	Friedrich Schiller died in 1805 and was buried in a common grave in Weimar. The mass grave was disinterred in 1826 to recover his skull, but it was not clear which of the 23 skulls belonged to Schiller. The mayor of Weimar selected the largest of the skulls, and Johann Wolfgang von Goethe took it home and wrote a poem about it. It was then transferred to Weimar's ducal vault in 1827. A DNA analysis conducted in 2006 determined that the skull did not belong to Schiller.
Heart of Percy Bysshe Shelley	Percy Bysshe Shelley		Heart	After Percy Bysshe Shelley died, his body was cremated on the beach. Rather than becoming ash in the fire, Shelley's heart did not burn. Edward John Trelawney collected the heart and gave it to Mary Shelley. She was said to keep the heart in her desk for the remainder of her life, some 30 years. There was speculation that the heart was actually his liver or kidney. The Shelleys' son, Percy Florence Shelley, found the organ on top of his mother's desk, wrapped in silk and kept alongside a passage that had been torn out from Percy Bysshe Shelley's poem Adonais.
Daniel Sickles's leg	Daniel Sickles	National Museum of Health and Medicine	Leg	Union Army general Daniel Sickles had his right leg amputated above the knee after a cannonball wound suffered at the Battle of Gettysburg on July 2, 1863. The limb was donated to the Army Medical Museum (now the National Museum of Health and Medicine), where it was used as a teaching example of battlefield trauma. Sickles sometimes visited the limb on the anniversary of its loss, and sometimes brought visitors with him, including, on one occasion, Mark Twain who stated that he believed the general valued the lost leg more than his still-extant one.
Bladder of Lazzaro Spallanzani	Lazzaro Spallanzani	University History Museum, University of Pavia	Bladder	Lazzaro Spallanzani died from bladder cancer in 1799. After his death, his bladder was removed for study by his colleagues, after which it was placed on public display in a museum in Pavia, where it remains to this day.
Skull of André Tchaikowsky	André Tchaikowsky	Royal Shakespeare Company	Skull	Polish pianist André Tchaikowsky (1935–1982) bequeathed his skull to the Royal Shakespeare Company so it could be used in theatrical performances. The skull was received by the props department, to the "evident delight" of the department's dog. It bleached and dried on a rooftop for up to two years. It was used in rehearsals for a 1989 production of Hamlet starring Mark Rylance. The skull had its stage debut portraying Yorick in a 2008 production of Hamlet that starred David Tennant in the title role.
Lord Uxbridge's leg (artificial leg depicted)	Lord Uxbridge		Leg	At the Battle of Waterloo, a cannon shot struck the right leg of Henry Paget, 2nd Earl of Uxbridge. He remarked to the Duke of Wellington: "By God, sir, I've lost my leg." The leg was amputated above the knee and taken to the village of Waterloo in Belgium. M. Hyacinthe Joseph-Marie Paris, the owner of the house where the leg was amputated, asked to keep the leg to bury it in his garden. It later became a tourist attraction.
Van Gogh's ear	Vincent van Gogh	Lost	Ear	On 23 December 1888, Van Gogh is thought to have severed his left ear with a razor. The diagonal cut removed the lobe and probably a little more, causing severe bleeding. He bandaged the wound, wrapped the ear in paper and delivered the package to a woman who worked at a cafe that he frequented and was a cleaner at a brothel. Van Gogh was found unconscious the next morning by a policeman and taken to hospital, where he was treated by Félix Rey, a young doctor still in training. The ear was brought to the hospital, but Rey did not attempt to reattach it as too much time had passed. Historians have suggested that Paul Gauguin may have sliced the ear off with a sword during a fight.
Jonathan Walker's hand	Jonathan Walker	Evergreen Cemetery; Muskegon, Michigan, U.S.	Hand	The abolitionist Jonathan Walker aided people who were escaping slavery. He was convicted in Pensacola of "slave stealing" and had the initials "SS" branded with a hot iron on his right hand by United States Marshal Eben Dorr. John Greenleaf Whittier's poem "The Branded Hand" pays tribute to the hand. A c. 1845 daguerreotype of his hand was called "one of the earliest conceptual portraits in that a body part can stand for the total personality." Walker was buried in Evergreen Cemetery in Muskegon, Michigan. A monument in the cemetery reads "Capt. Walker's Branded Hand" and includes a depiction of the hand.
George Washington's hair	George Washington	Multiple locations	Hair	George Washington gave away many locks of hair during his lifetime. As of 2024, over 100 museums and history centers hold locks of hair purported to have belonged to Washington. Locks of Washington's hair are held by Mount Vernon, Union College, and the Missouri History Museum. A lock of his hair was launched into space aboard the Vulcan Centaur in January 2024.
George Washington's teeth (dentures shown)	George Washington	New York Academy of Medicine	Teeth	Washington lost all of his teeth during his life. His final tooth was pulled by the dentist John Greenwood, who kept it as a souvenir in a small oval glass locket. The tooth is held by the library of the New York Academy of Medicine.
Charles Whitman's brain	Charles Whitman	Lost	Brain	Charles Whitman, perpetrator of the University of Texas tower shooting, requested an autopsy following his death. Neuropathologist Coleman de Chenar conducted the autopsy, determining that Whitman had a five-centimeter astrocytoma (brain tumor) pressing against his amygdala. Following the autopsy, Whitman's brain was kept in the collection of Chenar. It may have later been transferred to the Austin State Hospital. Whitman's brain was thought to be among 100 brains that were reported as missing from a brain repository at the University of Texas at Austin in 2014. Officials later clarified that they had "no evidence at this time that any of the brain specimens came from Charles Whitman".
Walt Whitman's brain	Walt Whitman	Lost	Brain	Following his death in 1892, Walt Whitman's brain was donated to the American Anthropometric Society in Philadelphia. The brain was dropped by a laboratory assistant, broke into pieces, and was thrown away. According to Edward Anthony Spitzka, "The brain of Walt Whitman, together with the jar in which it had been placed, was said to have been dropped on the floor by a careless assistant. Unfortunately, not even the pieces were saved." A 2014 paper blamed Henry Cattell for dropping the brain.
Arm of Francis Xavier	Francis Xavier	Church of the Gesù ---- Chapel of St. Francis Xavier	Arm	Xavier died in 1552 in China. His body was transported to Goa. In 1614, Pope Paul V ordered the removal of his right arm up to the elbow so that it could be taken to Rome. The arm is kept in a silver reliquary in the Jesuit Church of the Gesù in Rome and toured Canada in 2018. Three other bone fragments, from the right arm above the elbow, were removed in 1619 and sent to Jesuit Colleges in Cochin, Macau, and Malacca. One of the fragments is held by the Chapel of St. Francis Xavier in Macau and was brought to Newark, New Jersey, for veneration in 1965 at the request of cardinal Francis Spellman.
Toe of Francis Xavier	Francis Xavier	Bitten off but recovered	Toe	Several toes are missing from Xavier's corpse. During testimony for his beatification in 1616, it was attested that a woman called Isabel de Carom, kissing the feet of the cadaver, had bitten off one of the toes and that blood had flowed from the wound. The family returned the toe in 2006.
Yagan's head	Yagan	Belhus, Western Australia	Head	The Aboriginal Australian warrior Yagan was murdered in 1833 by British colonists. His head was removed, preserved by smoking, and taken to England by Robert Dale, who gave it to the Liverpool Institute for display in a museum. It had decomposed by 1964 and was buried in Everton Cemetery. Following a years-long campaign for the repatriation of the head by Noongar groups, it was exhumed in 1997 and returned to Australia. The head was re-buried in 2010.

== See also ==
- Hanānā
- Herzgruft
- Human trophy collecting
- Lampshades made from human skin
- List of books bound in human skin
- List of skulls used to depict Yorick
- Mike Tyson's tattoos
- Mokomokai
- Murder for body parts
- Nose tomb
- Plastination
- Salish Sea human foot discoveries
