= Galileo's middle finger =

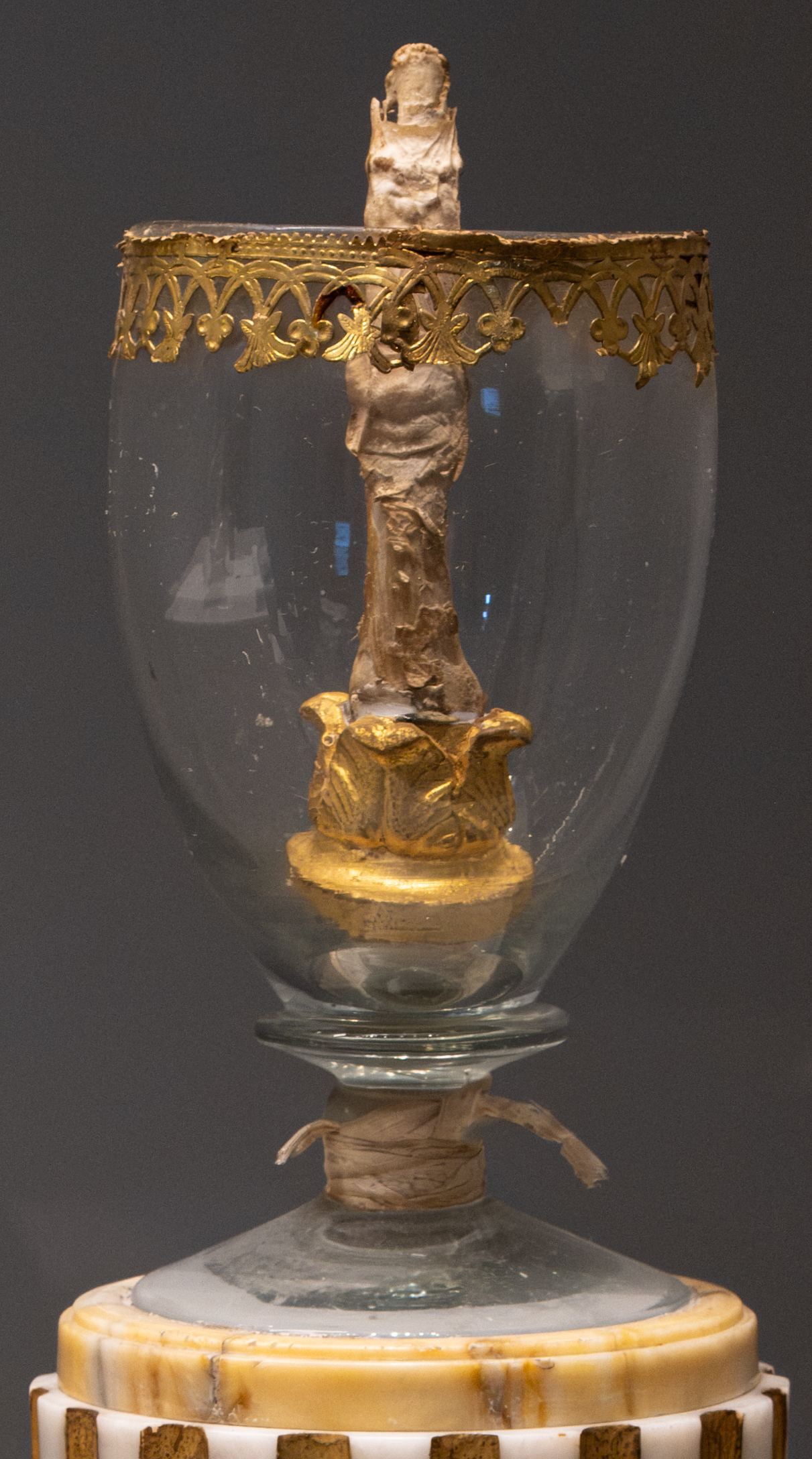
Galileo's middle finger in its glass enclosure

The middle finger from the right hand of Italian astronomer Galileo Galilei (1564–1642) is a secular relic in the collection of the Museo Galileo in Florence, Italy. The finger was removed from his body after his death, and is encased in a gilded glass egg.

In 1737, 95 years after he died, Galileo's remains were transferred to a mausoleum at the Basilica di Santa Croce in Florence. Antiquarian Anton Francesco Gori, anatomist Antonio Cocchi, and Italian marquis Vincenzio Capponi removed the finger of Galileo's right hand as well as one of his vertebrae, an index finger, a thumb, and a tooth. The middle finger passed to Angelo Maria Bandini, who exhibited it at the Laurentian Library. In 1841, the finger was moved to the Tribune of Galileo at La Specola. It was then transferred to the Institute and Museum of the History of Science in 1927.

== Background ==
Italian astronomer Galileo Galilei died in 1642 and had stipulated in his will that his remains go to Basilica di Santa Croce, beside those of his father, Vincenzo Galilei. Authorities from the Catholic Church did not want him to be buried on consecrated grounds given his views on Copernican heliocentrism, which were considered heretical at the time. (Note: The church did not admit that it erred in condemning Galileo until 1992.) Cardinal Francesco Barberini addressed the matter, writing that people might be scandalized by his entombment in the mausoleum. Instead, his remains were placed in a small enclosure near the Chapel of Saints Cosimo and Damiano.

In 1688, Galileo's pupil Vincenzo Viviani stipulated in his will that his fortune should be used to establish a mausoleum for Galileo. The mausoleum was not constructed until well after Viviani's death, delayed at first by the potential disapproval of the Catholic Church and later by the "dillydallying" of Viviani's nephew and heir, Abbot Jacopo Panzanini.

== Removal from corpse ==
Ninety-five years after his death, on 12 March 1737, Galileo's remains were transferred from an unconsecrated box underneath the Santa Croce bell tower to a memorial tomb inside the church, near Michelangelo's fingers and bones. In a ceremony resembling the transfer of a saintly relic, Galileo's remains were taken from his heretic's grave to the mausoleum of the Basilica di Santa Croce.

The botanist Giovanni Targioni Tozzetti attended the transfer and had brought a knife. Anatomist Antonio Cocchi, Italian marquis Vincenzio Capponi, and antiquarian Anton Francesco Gori used the knife to remove the middle finger from Galileo's corpse, along with his thumb, index finger, one of his teeth, and his fifth lumbar vertebra. The tooth, index finger, and thumb were placed in a handblown glass base and remained with the Capponi family until the beginning of the 20th century. Tozzetti later wrote that Capponi's explanation for taking the two fingers as relics was "because Galileo wrote so many beautiful things with them." The vertebra was donated to the University of Padua by Domenico Thiene in 1823.

== Exhibition history ==
The middle finger was later acquired by Angelo Maria Bandini of the Laurentian Library, where it was exhibited. In 1841, the finger was moved to the Tribune of Galileo at the Museum of Physics and Nature (now La Specola) along with Galileo's Medici-Lorraine instruments. In 1927, it was moved to the Institute and Museum of the History of Science (Museo di Storia della Scienza). The museum's inventory originally listed the finger as his left index finger, though University of Florence professor Francesco Leoncini added a footnote indicating that it was Galileo's right middle finger.

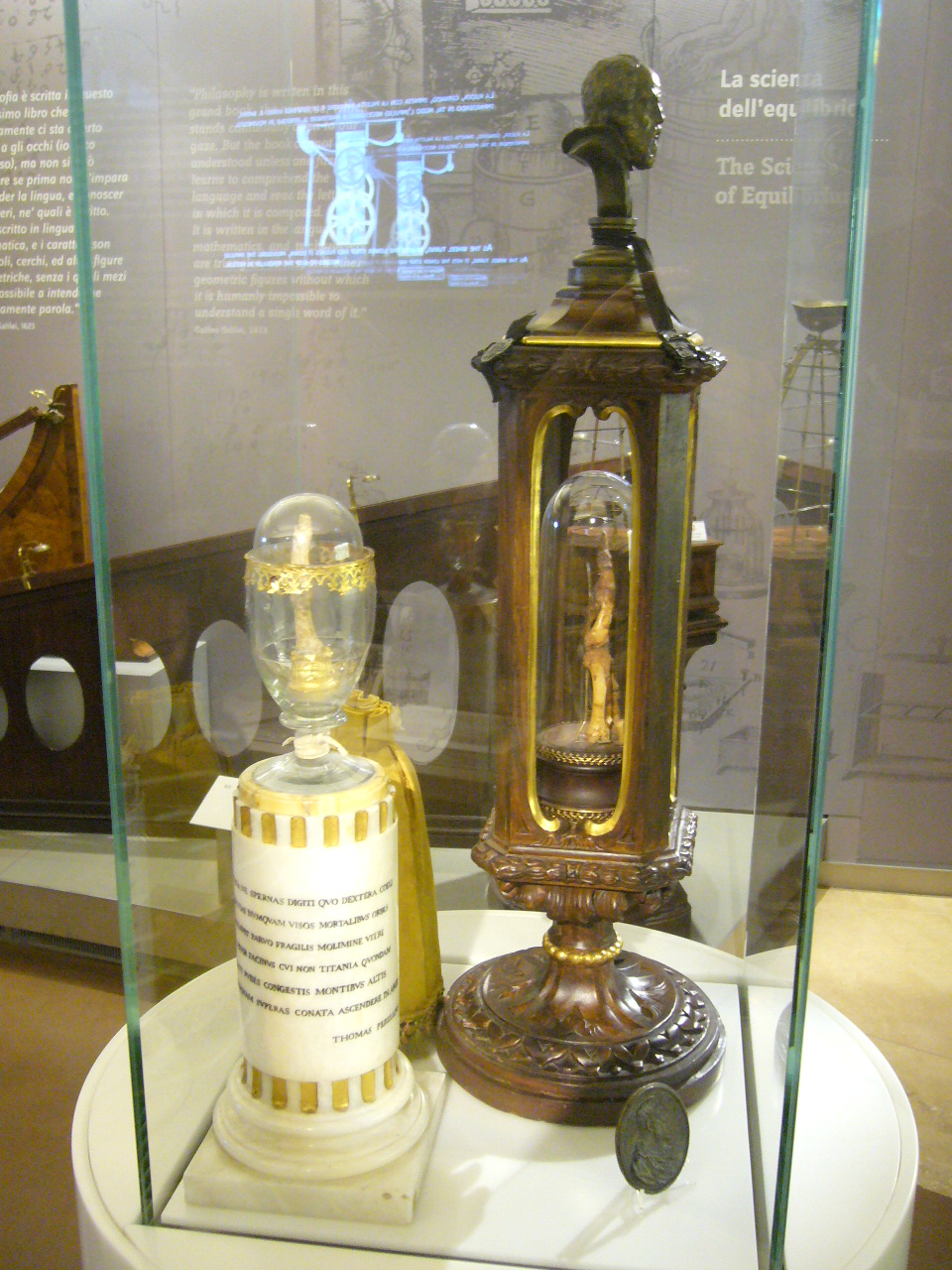
Display case at Museo Galileo including Galileo's middle and index fingers

It eventually came to be included in the Museo Galileo collection. The finger is encased in an egg-shaped glass display above a cylindrical marble base. The base includes a commemorative inscription by astronomer Tommaso Perelli. According to the museum, Galileo's middle finger "exemplifies the celebration of Galileo as a hero and martyr of science". The finger is displayed alongside the objective lens from Galileo's telescope.

The Latin inscription by Tommaso Perelli reads:

Leipsana ne spernas digiti quo dextera coeli
Mensa vias nunquam visos mortalibus orbes
Monstravit, parvo fragilis molimine vitri
Ausa prior facinus cui non Titania quondam
Suffecit pubes congestis montibus altis
Nequidquam superas conata ascendere in arces. (Note: A different version is found in Le opere di Galileo Galilei, prima edizione completa, condotta sugli autentici manoscritti Palatini e dedicata a S.A.I. e R. Leopoldo II with the final two verses being Suffecit ter nequidquam conata juventus, Scandere sidereas congestis montibus arces.)

Spurn not the remains of the finger by which the right hand measured out paths of the sky, pointed to orbs (Note: The orbs refer to Jupiter's four brightest moons.) never before seen by mortals; with the aid of a small pile of fragile glass (Note: Fragile glass refers to the objective lens of Galileo's telescope.) first dared the deed to which Titania, in full vigor, on mountains heaped high, was once inadequate, having tried in vain to ascend into the loftiest heavens.

— Tommaso Perelli

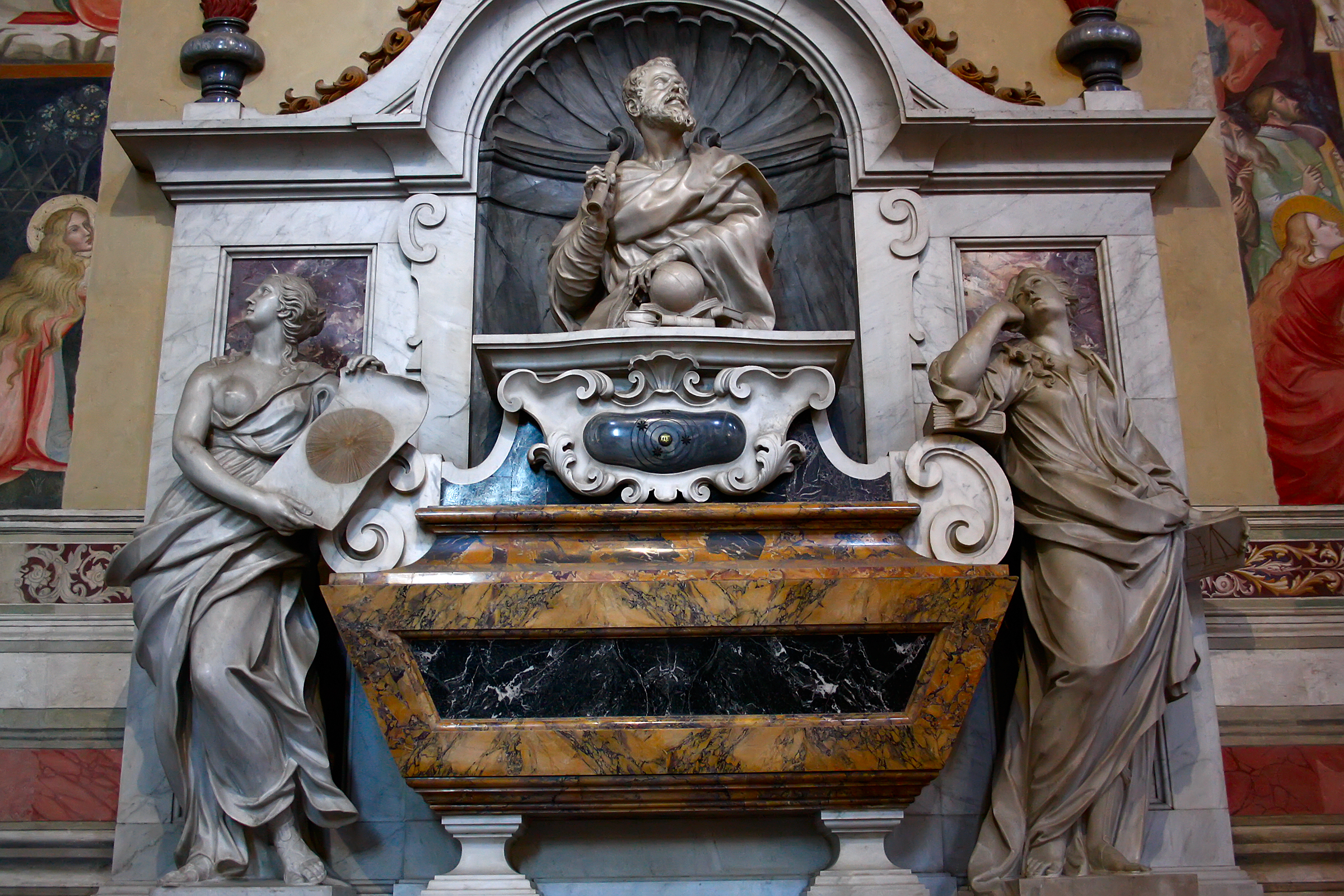
The tomb of Galileo, at the Basilica di Santa Croce, containing the rest of his remains

American journalist Nino Lo Bello wrote in 1986 about his attempts to track down Galileo's finger in the 1960s. He reported being told by an employee of the National Library that it had resided there for years before it was given to the Museum of the History of Science.

Galileo's middle finger is a rare example of a secular relic, the preservation of body parts being a practice usually reserved for saints within the Catholic Church. Bonnie Gordon remarked on "the irony of preserving relic style the remains of a heretic". British art critic Julian Spalding remarked that the Museum of Science took pride in the finger, adding "I don't particularly recommend going to see it, because what is the point of looking at Galileo's finger?"

In Italy, Galileo's middle finger is considered the property of the state.

== Galileo's other body parts ==
Galileo's index finger, the thumb of his right hand, and a tooth were sealed in a glass jar that disappeared sometime after 1905 and remained lost to the public until 2009. Rufus Suter wrote in 1951 that the other two fingers were said to be preserved in the reliquary of Luigi Rosselli del Turco in Florence. They turned up at auction in 2009 and were turned over to the Museum. The Museum applied a DNA test to forensically confirm the authenticity of the remains. One of Galileo's vertebrae is kept at the University of Padua.

== See also ==
- List of individual body parts
