= List of body parts =

List of body parts could refer to:

- List of individual body parts
- List of organs of the human body
