= António Luís Costa =

Portuguese serial killer

- Born: 1953 (age 72–73); Santa Comba Dão, Portugal
- Conviction: Murder (3 counts)
- Penalty: 25 years imprisonment

Details
- Victims: 3
- Span of crimes: 2005–2006
- Country: Portugal
- Date apprehended: 24 June 2006
- Imprisoned at: Évora prison

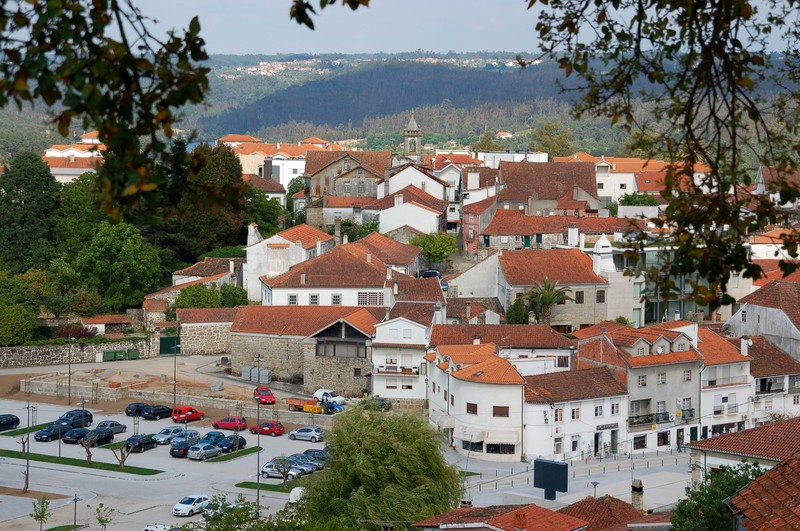
The town of Santa Comba Dão

António Luís Costa (born 1953) is a Portuguese retired GNR soldier and serial killer from Santa Comba Dão. He was convicted in 2007 for the murders of three young women between May 2005 and May 2006. He is currently held in the prison of Évora. The case received extensive media attention in Portugal. It was front page in some newspapers.

== Murders ==
Costa's first victim was Isabel Cristina Isidoro, who went missing on 24 May 2005; her body was recovered from the ocean on 31 May 2005. Mariana Lourenço went missing on 14 October 2005, and her mutilated body was found in June 2006. The third and last victim was Joana Oliveira, who went missing on 8 May 2006; her body was recovered from under a bridge based on directions given by Costa. According to Costa, after he had consensual sexual relations with the first victim and asked for a kiss from the second and third victims, he suffocated them when they threatened to tell.

== Arrest and confession ==
Costa was arrested by the Polícia Judiciária (PJ) on 24 June 2006. At first, he confessed the crimes, both to the police and to the judge conducting the preliminary investigation. He later withdrew his confession and accused an uncle of Lourenço for the crimes. He claimed police coerced him into confessing, an accusation refuted by the PJ. Costa's telephone was tapped, and he was recorded confessing the crimes to his family.

== Trial ==
Costa's trial began on 4 July 2007; he was charged with three murders, three crimes of hiding the body, one crime of profaning the body (for undressing a body), two crimes of attempting sexual coercion, and one crime of calumnious denunciation (for accusing Lourenço's uncle of the crimes). During the trial, Costa claimed his innocence and remained silent except for the first and last court sessions.

The Ministério Público asked for a sentence of 25 years in prison, the maximum allowed under Portuguese law, and said the only reason they did not ask for more is because it is not possible. The prosecution said Costa acted on a sexual impulse and that from the start, he tried to be considered insane as a means of escaping trial; however, two psychiatric examinations found Costa to be sane enough to stand trial.

The defence said psychiatric examinations found no psychopathy and no promiscuous sexual behaviour. In addition, the defence claimed the rights of the defendant were not respected because he was treated as a guilty psychopathic serial killer. The defence said the testimony given by witnesses may not be reliable because of inconsistencies and discussion of the case among witnesses. The police investigation was criticized by the defence, which claimed some persons were not investigated enough.

On 31 July 2007, the court found Costa guilty of all charges except for the crime of hiding Isidoro's body, since she was still alive when she was thrown into the Atlantic Ocean. Costa was sentenced to 64.5 years in prison, reduced to 25 years, the maximum penalty under Portuguese law. His defence announced they would appeal the conviction.

On 18 June 2020, Costa was denied parole.

The case raised some criticisms towards the Portuguese rule that sets 25 years in prison as the maximum penalty. Some people argued that more severe sentences should be allowed.

== See also ==
- Diogo Alves
- Luísa de Jesus
- List of serial killers by country
