= Tribune of Galileo =

Museum in Italy

Coordinates: 43°45′51.87″N 11°14′50.42″E

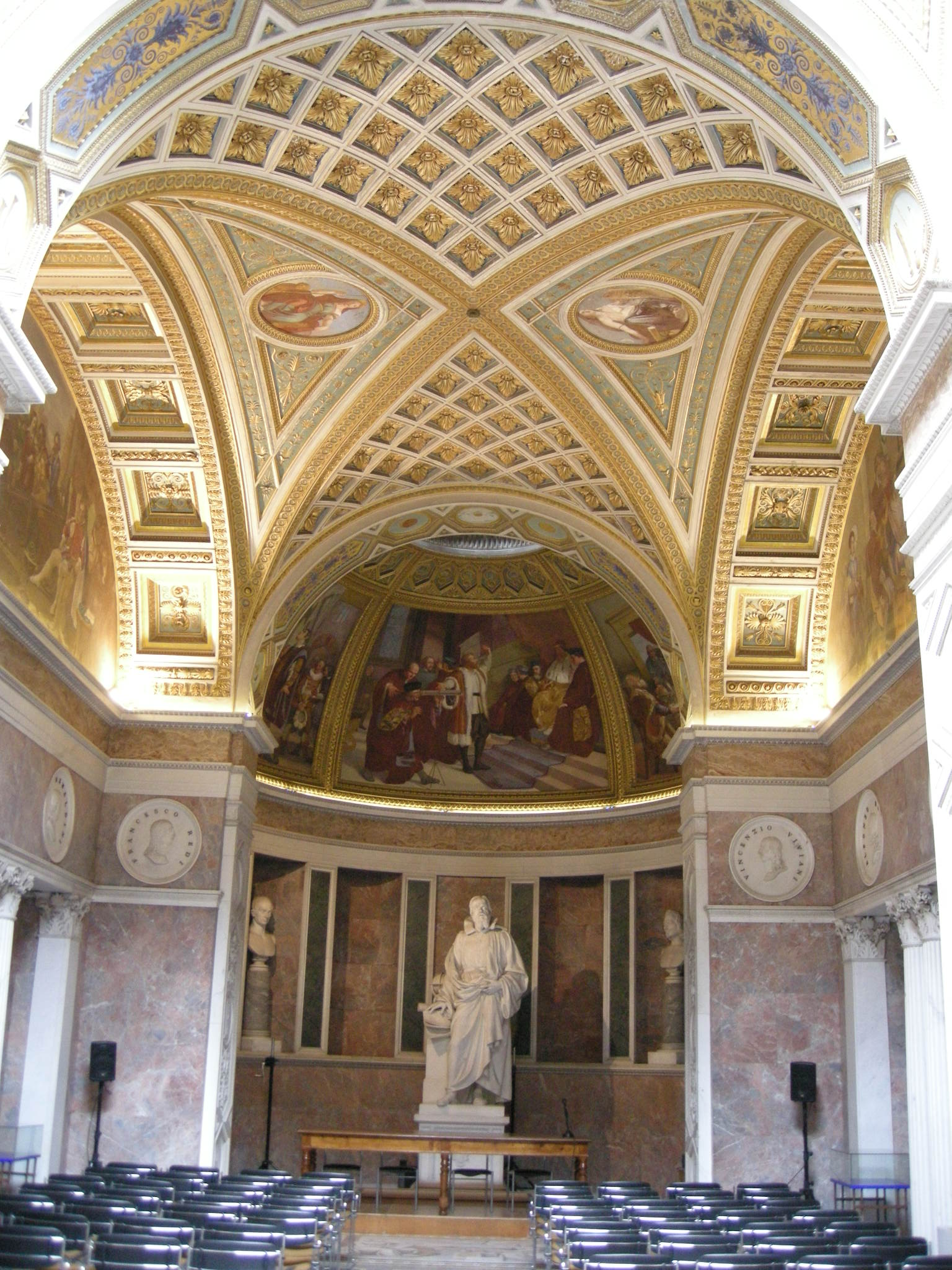
Tribune of Galileo interior: view across the anteroom toward the statue under the dome

The Tribune of Galileo (Italian: Tribuna di Galileo) is a Neoclassic architectural addition, built to commemorate the famous Florentine scientist, Galileo Galilei and to house some of his scientific instruments.

== Description ==
The tribune was completed in 1841 and built within the first floor of the Science Museum of La Specola in Florence. The tribune was built by orders of Leopold II (1797-1870). The House of Lorraine-Habsburg was foreign to Tuscany; and the embrace of Galileo can be seen as an attempt to co-opt local patriotism. It contains a large statue of Galileo and a series of lunettes and frescoes depicting events in scientific history relating to Florence. It once contained some of his original instruments such as his geometric and military compass, an armed loadstone, two telescopes, and the objective lens of the telescope with which Galileo discovered the four largest moons of Jupiter. The tribune is generally not open to the public.

The tribune consists mainly of two rooms: a square vaulted hall, and an adjacent square room glass-metal dome. The dome allows light to shine over a marble statue of Galileo by Aristodemo Costoli. The surrounding niches have busts of famous pupils of Galileo: Benedetto Castelli, Bonaventura Cavalieri, Evangelista Torricelli, and Vincenzo Viviani. Medallions in the adjacent hall commemorate the patrons. The frescoes on the walls depict:

- Leonardo da Vinci before the Duke of Milan, Ludovico Sforza (by Nicola Cianfanelli)
- Galileo demonstrates the Laws of Gravity to the Medici (by Giuseppe Bezzuoli)
- Galileo observes the lamp-pendulum of the Duomo of Pisa (by Luigi Sabatelli)
- Galileo presents the telescope to the Senate of Venice (by Luigi Sabatelli)
- Galileo, blind and old, converses with disciples (by Luigi Sabatelli)
- Session of Experiments at the Accademia del Cimento (by Gasparo Martellini)
- Alessandro Volta demonstrates his experimental battery to Napoleon (design by Cianfanelli, completed by Martellini).

Ultimately, this is considered an odd architectural assembly. The layout has a distant resemblance to a church dome and nave; however, if so, this is a temple granting hagiographical attention to a secular scientist. It contains modern touches, such as the iron dome, but it also adheres to retardataire Neoclassic elements in the niches, arches, and columns. The arrangement suggests a tardy apology to Galileo by an aristocracy which had been slow to freely embrace his pioneering spirit of Enlightenment. It took two centuries for Florentines to honor their greatest scientist with a building. But that is not surprising, they had also been slow to bury Galileo inside a church. After his death in 1642, his interment in the main body of the Basilica of Santa Croce, next to the tombs of his father and other ancestors, was abandoned when papal authorities protested.

== Gallery ==
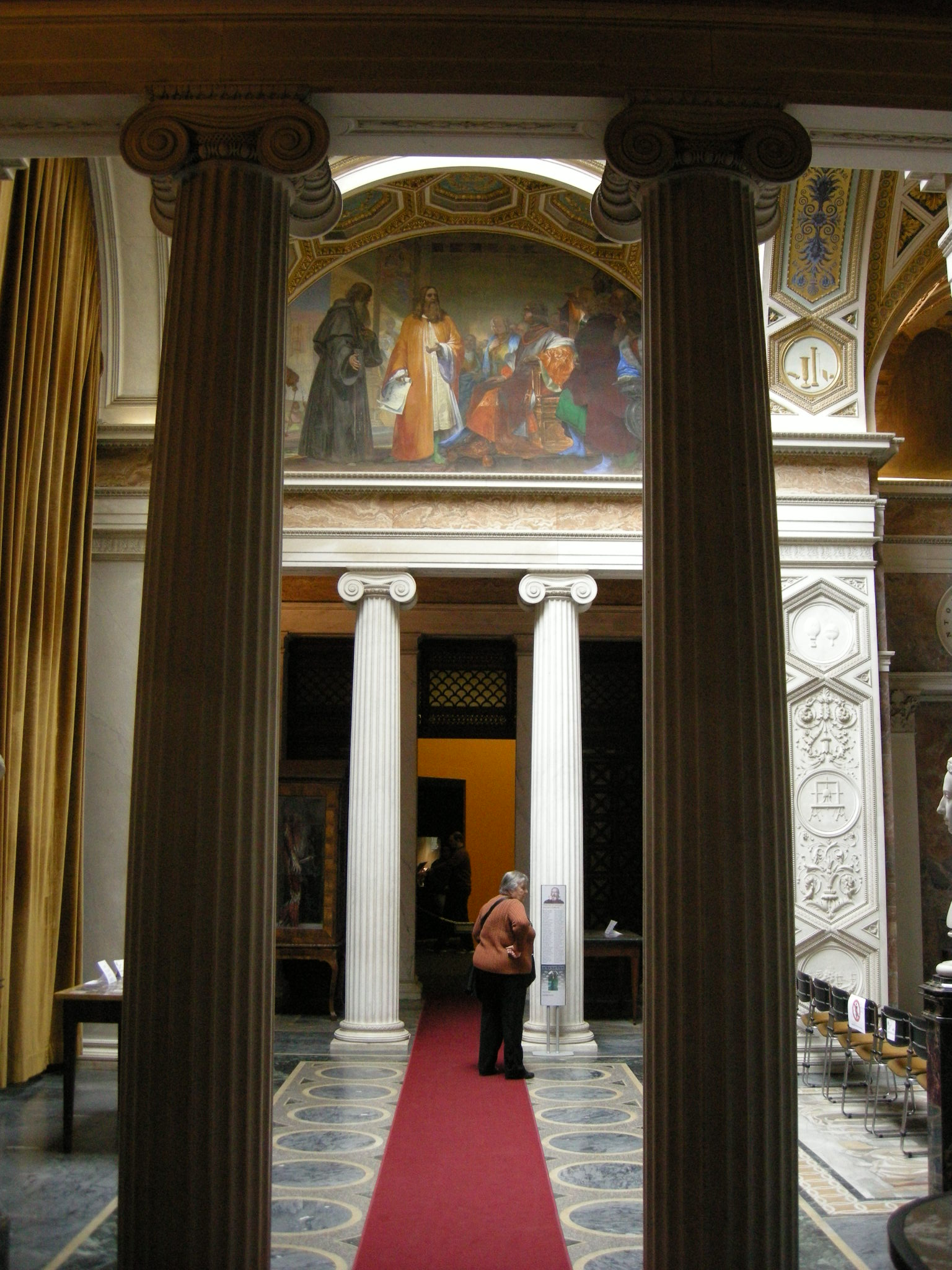
View across anteroom showing lunette

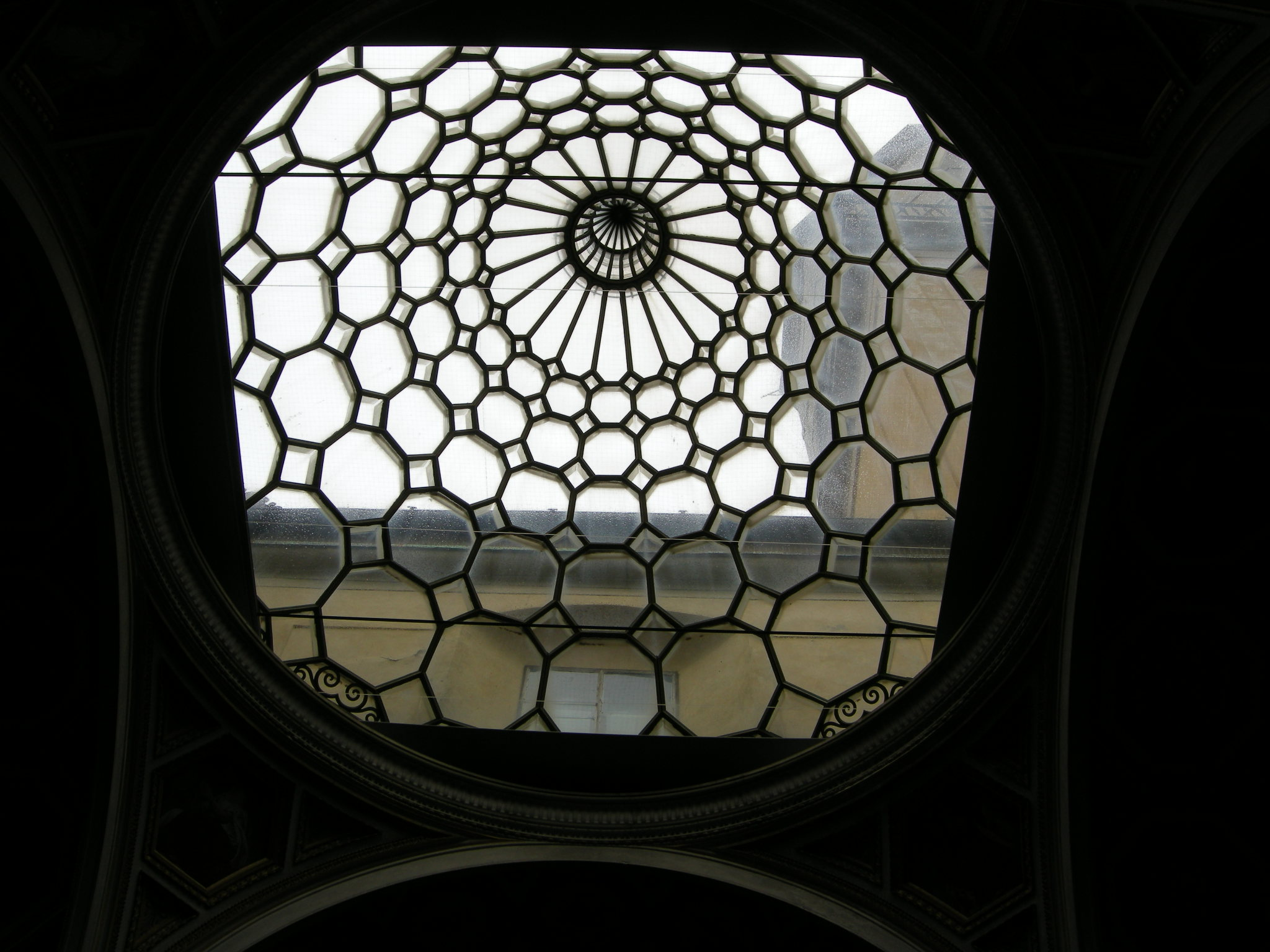
Glass and iron dome

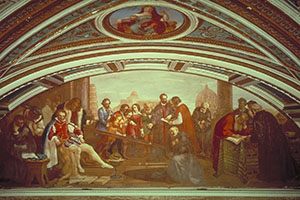
Galileo demonstrates laws of gravity

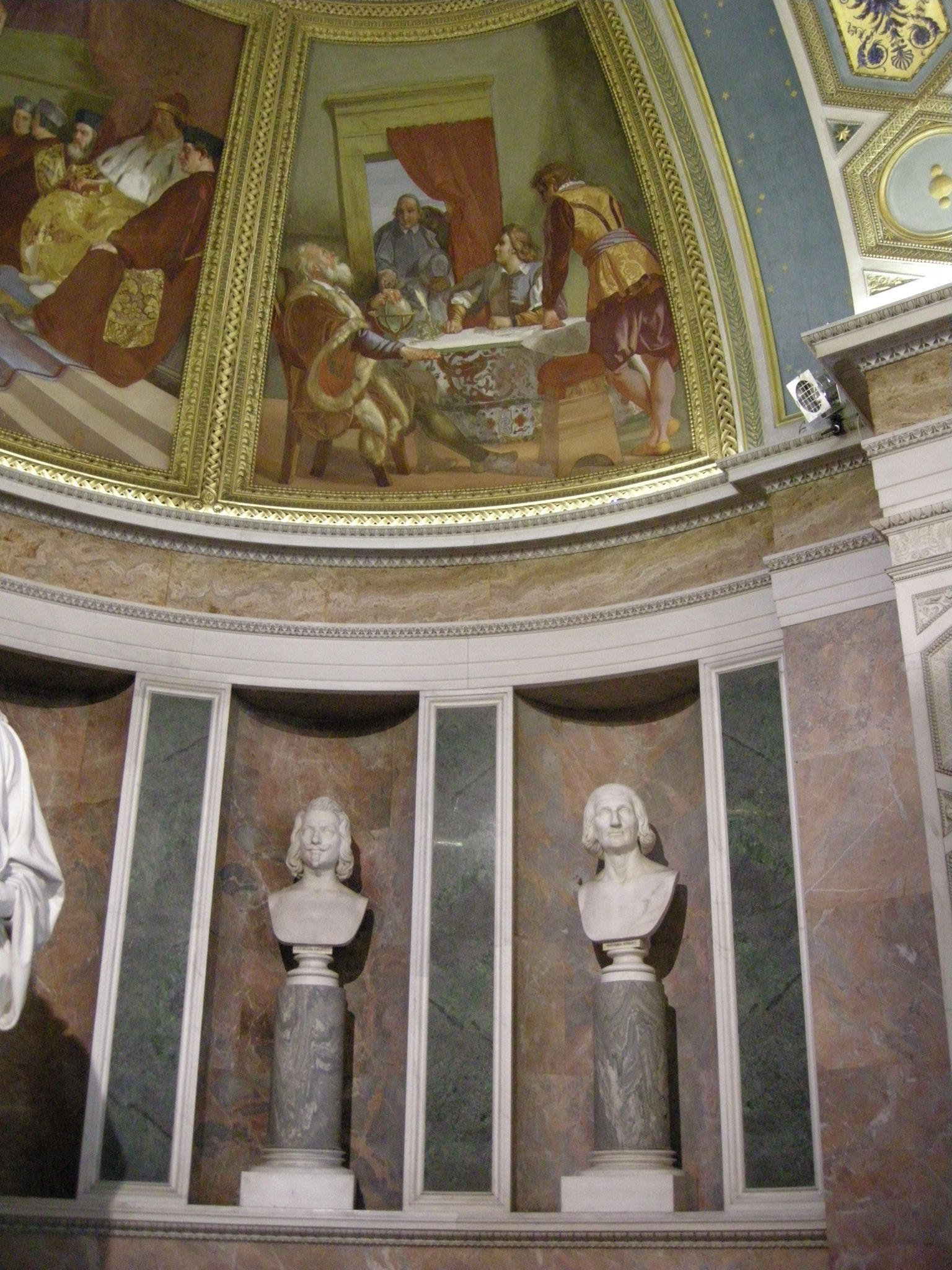
Apse and busts

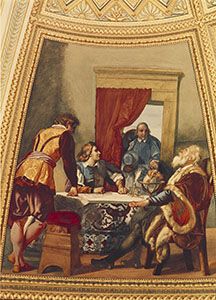
Galileo with disciples

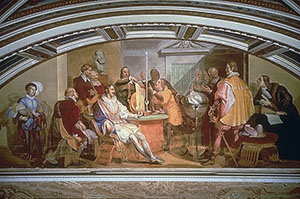
Session of Accademia del Cimento

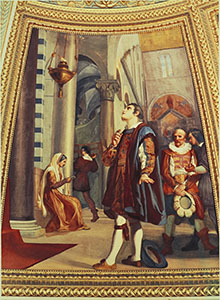
Galileo in the Duomo of Pisa

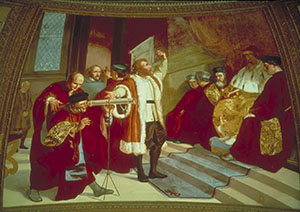
Galileo before Senate of Venice
