= Figueira de Lorvão =

- Civil parish
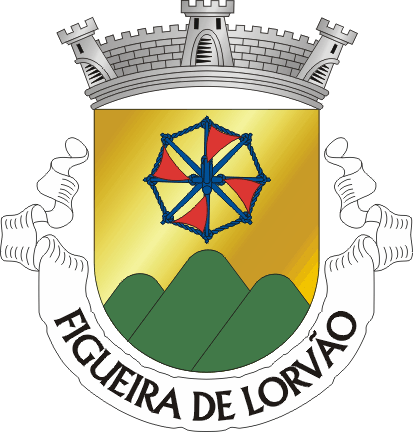
- Coat of arms

- Location in Portugal
- Coordinates: 40.288°N 8.352°W
- Country: Portugal
- Region: Centro
- Intermunic. comm.: Região de Coimbra
- District: Coimbra
- Municipality: Penacova

Area
  - Total: 26.68 km^{2} (10.30 sq mi)

Population (2011)
  - Total: 2,737
  - Density: 102.6/km^{2} (265.7/sq mi)
- Time zone: UTC+00:00 (WET)
  - Summer (DST): UTC+01:00 (WEST)
- Website: www.jf-figueiradelorvao.pt

Figueira de Lorvão is a parish in Penacova Municipality, Portugal. The population in 2011 was 2,737, in an area of 26.68 km^{2}. It is the birthplace of the last female Portuguese serial killer executed in the country's history, Luísa de Jesus.
