= Vittorio Crosten =

Italian carver

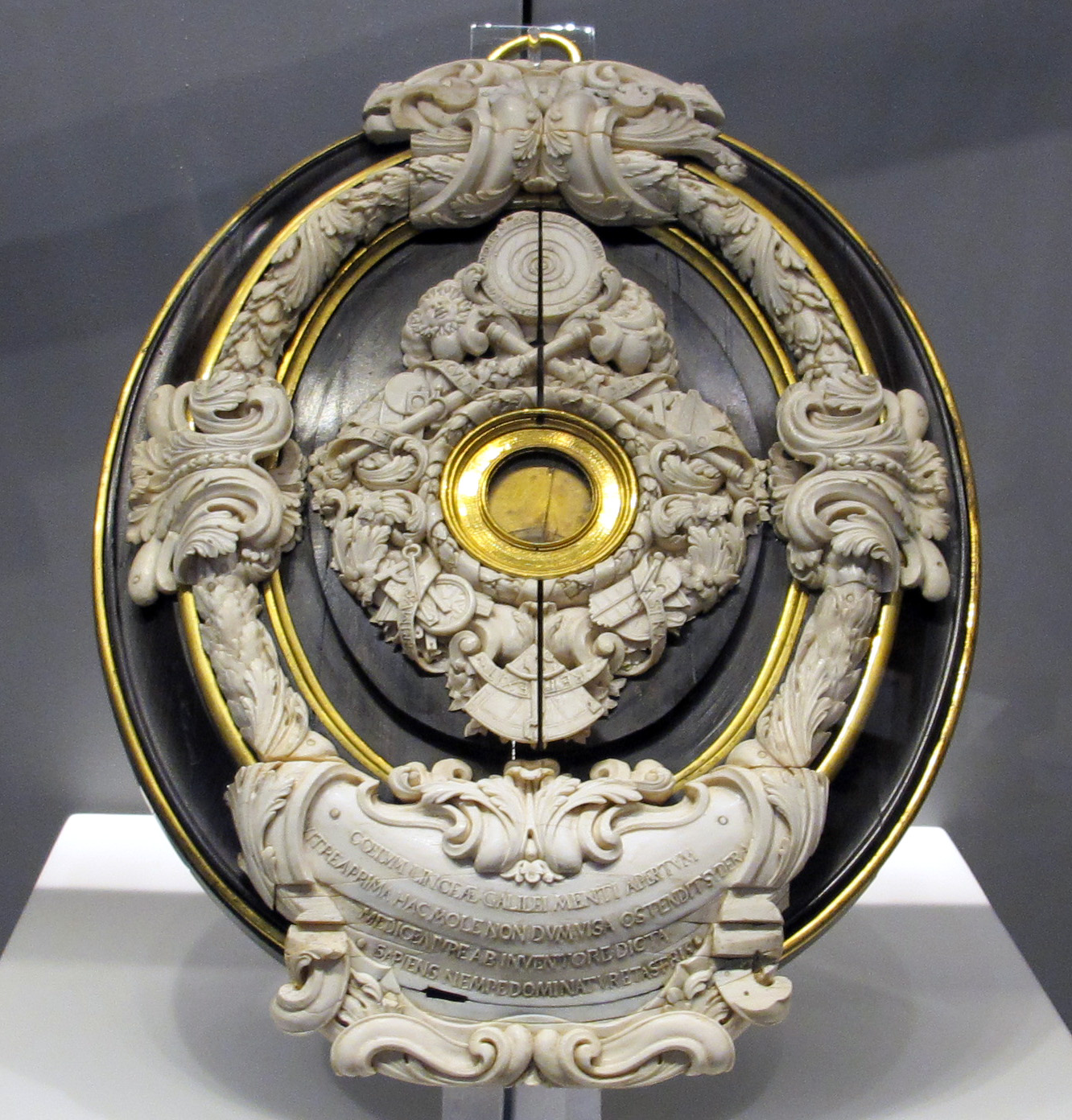
Crosten's frame for Galileo's objective lens.

Vittorio Crosten (fl. 17th century) was an able carver of Dutch origin.

Vittorio Crosten (also known by names of "Victor" and "Crost") practiced his craft at the court of Grand Duke Cosimo III de' Medici (1642-1723) in the second half of the seventeenth century. He was of Dutch origin and is documented as working in Cosimo's ducal workshops from 1663 to 1704. He made frames, table bases, carvings for carriages, lampshades, drawers for jewelry, and ivory reliefs. Crosten's ornamentation evokes the world of nature, particularly botanical species. Objects inlaid by Crosten are now preserved in the Museo degli Argenti, Museo dell'Opificio delle Pietre Dure, Palazzo Pitti and other Florentine museums.

The Museo Galileo possesses an ebony and ivory frame carved and engraved by Crosten which holds the objective lens from the telescope used by Galileo Galilei in his discovery of the four largest moons of Jupiter. The frame is carved with floral motifs, images of scientific instruments and Latin inscriptions commemorating Galileo's achievements and his connection to the Medici family. A cartouche is inscribed COELUM LINCEAE GALILEI MENTI APERTUM VITREA PRIMA HAC MOLE NONDUM VISA OSTENDIT SYDERA MEDICEA IURE AB INVENTORE DICTA SAPIENS NEMPE DOMINATUR ET ASTRIS ("The sky opened by the lynx-like thought of Galileo with this first glass lens showed stars never seen before, rightly called Medicean by their discoverer. The wise man indeed dominates the stars as well"). Below the cartouche appear the initials of the engraver "VC".
