= Nicola Cianfanelli =

Italian painter (1793–1848)

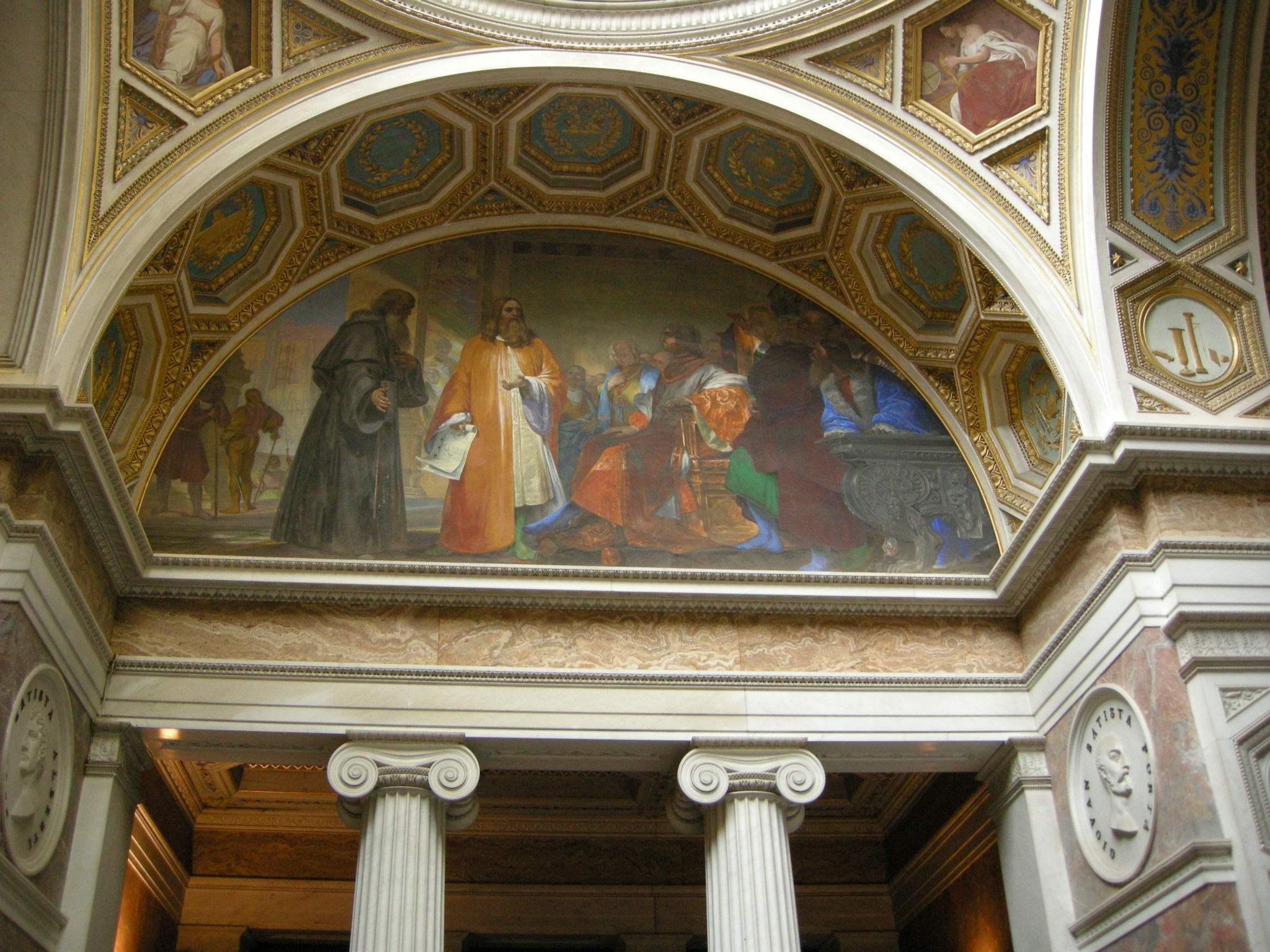
Leonardo da Vinci before the Duke of Milan, Ludovico Sforza ( Tribuna of Galileo, 1841)

Niccola Cianfanelli (19 July 1793 in Moscow – 30 August 1848 in Florence) was an Italian painter and restorer. He mainly painted historic and sacred subjects in a Neoclassical style.

He studied under Pietro Benvenuti at the Academy of Fine Arts in Florence. Among his works was the fresco of Ercole and Jole in the salon of the Palazzo Borghese in Florence. He painted the sipario theater curtain of the Niccolini Theater in Florence with a depiction of a passage from the poetry of Pulci, La giostra di Lorenzo il Magnifico col Borromeo sulla piazza di Santa Croce. He painted an oil canvas depicting the Adoration of the Magi for the church of Santa Felicita in Florence. He frescoed scenes from The Betrothed for the walls of a room in the royal palace (Palazzina della Meridiana di Boboli) in Florence.

He was commissioned to complete lunettes for the Tribune of Galileo (built in 1841 at present site of La Specola Museum): he completed Leonardo presents mathematician Luca Pacioli to Lodovico il Moro, but left the other lunette as a study with Volta experiments his discovery of the battery to Napoleon. In Genoa, he painted frescoes of the Martyrdom of San Giacomo in the apse, and a canvas depicting, Massacre of the Innocents, for the church of San Giacomo. He also painted for Villa Puccini in Pistoia: Cellini presents to Cosimo I and Eleonora of Toledo the model of Perseus.
