= National Museum of Dentistry =

Museum in Baltimore, Maryland, US

Dr. Samuel D. Harris National Museum of Dentistry

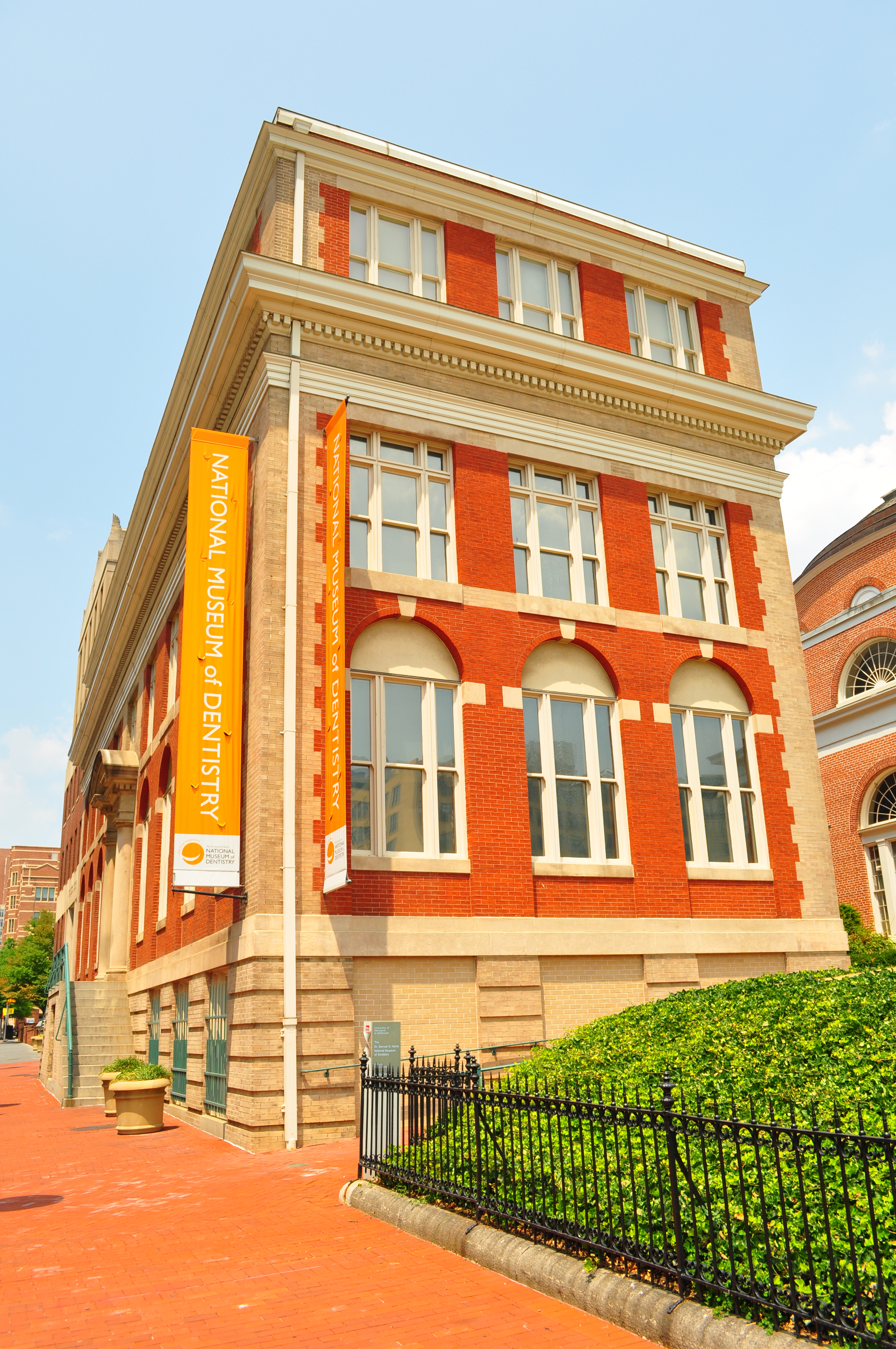
- National Museum of Dentistry in Baltimore, Maryland
- Established: 1996
- Location: Baltimore, Maryland
- Coordinates: 39°17′16″N 76°37′24″W
- Website: www.dentalmuseum.com

The Dr. Samuel D. Harris National Museum of Dentistry – located in Baltimore, Maryland, and opened in 1996 – preserves and exhibits the history of dentistry in the United States and throughout the world. Situated on the campus of the University of Maryland, Baltimore, home of the nation's first dental school, The Baltimore College of Dental Surgery, it exhibits numerous artifacts concerning dentistry throughout the ages as well as exhibits on oral health and dentistry professionals. Highlights of the collection include George Washington's dentures, Queen Victoria's dental instruments, and the world's only tooth jukebox.

The museum has also been honored by receiving congressional designation as the nation's official dental museum (2003) and is an affiliate of the Smithsonian Institution.
