= Luísa de Jesus =

Executed Portuguese serial killer

- Born: 10 December 1748; Figueira de Lorvão, Coimbra, Portugal
- Died: 1 July 1772 (aged 23); Coimbra, Portugal
- Cause of death: Garroted
- Other name: "The Foundling Wheel Killer" (Portuguese: A Assassina da Roda) Luiza de Jesus
- Conviction: Murder x33
- Penalty: Death

Details
- Victims: 33–34
- Span of crimes: 1760s–1772
- Country: Portugal
- Location: Coimbra
- Date apprehended: April 1772

Luísa de Jesus (10 December 1748 – 1 July 1772), known as the Foundling Wheel Killer (Portuguese: A Assassina da Roda) and Luiza de Jesus (the way her name was spelled at the time), was a Portuguese delivery worker, baby farmer, fraudster and serial killer who smothered at least 33 infants in Coimbra from the 1760s until 1772. While she confessed to only 28 of these, she was convicted on all counts, sentenced to death and ultimately executed, becoming the last woman to be executed in the country's history. She is considered the deadliest serial killer in Portuguese history.

== Biography ==
Luísa de Jesus, spelt Luiza at the time, was born on 10 December 1748, in Figueira de Lorvão, a locality that was part of the municipality of Coimbra in the 18th century but which has been within Penacova municipality since the 19th century, the daughter of small-time farmers Manoel and Marianna Rodrigues. In the parish registers, there is only one entry that corresponds to the data mentioned by the judges: "On the eighteenth day of December of one thousand seven hundred and forty-eight, in this church of Figueira, Father João Baptista Barreto (...) baptised and placed the holy oils on Luiza, born on the tenth day of the same month and year, from the first marriage of Manoel Roiz and his wife Mariana Roiz, from Gavinhos (...)". Roiz is short for Rodrigues, the surname of the father and mother (first cousins) that appears in the judgement, and no law obliged them to give it to their children. In fact, until the 19th century, people could change their names throughout their lives. That's why Luísa used the surname Jesus, which didn't come from her parents, her grandparents or her husband Manuel Gomes. Little is known of her personal life, aside from the fact that she suffered no childhood abuse, and as an adult, she was married and would sometimes earn money from transporting goods from town to town, transporting parcels from the city of Coimbra to Gavinhos, a village of millers and farmers, or to the entire parish of Figueira do Lorvão.

Luísa de Jesus eventually hatched a money-making criminal scheme involving a foundling wheel in Coimbra: at the time, these devices were used by mothers to abandon their children at local charities, in the hopes that a good samaritan of means would take them instead. The prospective adoptive parents could then be awarded a 600 réis subsidy, a cradle and half a meter of thick cotton fabric for their generosity. Deciding to take advantage of this, de Jesus, using either her real name or that of her clients as a delivery worker, would adopt children at Coimbra's Foundling Wheel House as often as possible, but would then kill them by either smothering or strangling them. After successfully killing her victims, she would bury them either in shallow graves at the top of Monte Arroio (a street called Rua de Montarroio, near Coimbra's downtown, is the area's current approximate location), located at a close distance from Coimbra's Foundling Wheel House, under her house, also in Coimbra, or would stuff their bodies in clay pots. In total, she embezzled around 20,000 réis, the equivalent of six months' salary for a cook or a year's salary for a kitchen girl at the Royal Hospital of Caldas in Caldas da Rainha. The proceeds of the theft of subsidies may, however, have been shared with someone else.

Initially, nobody noted anything suspicious about the rate at which she adopted multiple children until 1 April 1772, when a worker at Coimbra's Foundling Wheel House, Angélica Maria, accidentally stumbled upon a shallow grave in Monte Arroio, containing the corpse of a baby with strangulation marks around its neck. She reported the finding to the authorities, who immediately started investigating, eventually discovering that the child had been adopted by de Jesus under her real name. She was subsequently taken for interrogation, where she immediately confessed that she had killed two newborns on April 6.

Upon hearing her confessions, the authorities searched de Jesus' home, where they unearthed a makeshift graveyard containing the bodies of 18 more infants, with 13 more discovered during excavations on Monte Arroio, for a total of 33 bodies found. Some of the infants' bodies had been dismembered or decapitated, but this was determined to be from decomposition. Upon inspecting adoption records, it was discovered that de Jesus had adopted a total of 34 babies, but she refused to divulge what had happened to the missing 34th baby and its body was never located.

As a result, de Jesus was charged with 33 counts of murder. Two employees at the local charity house were also indicted for criminal negligence in relation to the adoption procedures, but both were released in October of that year. In an attempt to escape prosecution, de Jesus' attorneys claimed as she was under 25 years of age, she was considered a minor under the law and thus ineligible for the death penalty. However, the group of judges, which included Pina Manique, rebuked that claim, exclaiming that if she was old enough to commit such atrocious crimes, then she would be judged as an adult. As a result, de Jesus was sentenced to death and ordered to pay approximately 20,000 réis to the state.

== Death ==
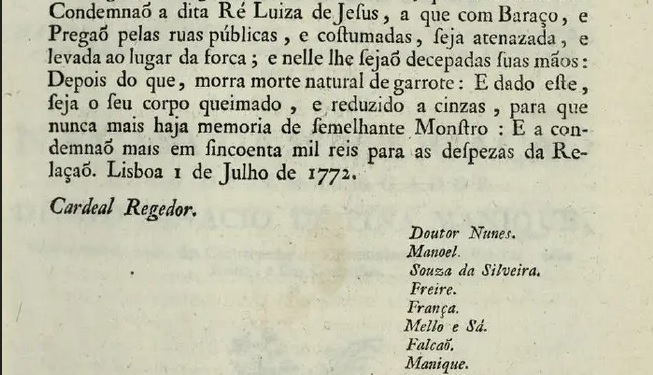
Excerpt from Luísa de Jesus' sentence delivered in the Casa da Suplicação

On 1 July 1772, De Jesus was paraded around town with a rope around her neck, while a magistrate read her crimes out loud to the onlookers. Her hands were then chopped off and she was burned with a red-hot iron, before she was ultimately garroted. De Jesus' body was summarily burned and her ashes scattered.

== Other suspects ==
Margarida Joaquina and Leocádia Maria da Conceição, a foundling wheel worker and a nanny at Coimbra's Foundling Wheel House, were arrested five days later. "The foundling wheel worker's procedure was what we would today call criminal negligence, since she had handed over all these children to a woman who went to collect them on behalf of others, without the person in charge of the foundling wheel investigating the children's fate," said historian Maria Antónia Lopes, who discovered in the records of Coimbra's public prison that the two officials "obtained a release permit" on 7 October 1772. A man called Pascoal Luís Ferreira da Silva registered the act of formally entrusting 34 institutionalized children released by Coimbra's Foundling Wheel House to Luiza de Jesus. Having graduated in law in 1735, six years after enrolling at the University of Coimbra, the lawyer must have been of advanced age. He was not, therefore, a naïve employee hired by the Coimbra's Foundling Wheel House to control the movements of the foundling wheel. However, nothing seems to have been ascertained as a wilful and lucrative involvement. He was arrested during the investigations and made a defendant in the case. At the time of Luiza de Jesus' sentencing, he was still in jail – he was probably released on the same date as the foundling wheel worker and the nanny.

== In the media and culture ==
Luísa de Jesus' crimes have been covered in numerous books about serial killers and the death penalty in Portugal. In 2021, a theatric play based on the 2020 book Luiza de Jesus – A Assassina da Roda by Rute de Carvalho Serra premiered in Lisbon, with the eponymous villainess portrayed by actress Maria Henrique.

== See also ==
- António Luís Costa
- Diogo Alves
- List of serial killers by country

== Bibliography ==
- António Braz de Oliveira (1982). As execuções capitais em Portugal num curioso manuscrito de 1844 [Capital executions in Portugal in a curious manuscript from 1844] (in Portuguese). Revista da Biblioteca Nacional. p. 116.
