= Blood Quran =

Copy of the Islamic holy book owned by Saddam Hussein

- Type: Quranic manuscript
- Material: Human blood
- Writing: Arabic
- Created: c. 1997
- Present location: Umm al-Qura Mosque

The Blood Quran is a copy of the Islamic holy book, the Quran, said to have been written in the blood of Saddam Hussein, the president of Iraq, over the course of two years in the late 1990s. Saddam commissioned the book in 1997 on his 60th birthday, reportedly to give thanks to God for helping him through many "conspiracies and dangers". He explained his reasons for commissioning the book in a letter published by the Iraqi state media in September 2000: "My life has been full of dangers in which I should have lost a lot of blood ... but since I have bled only a little, I asked somebody to write God's words with my blood in gratitude."

Saddam's act was denounced in 2000 by the religious authorities of the United Arab Emirates and Saudi Arabia, and, after his fall from power in 2003, the Quran was removed from public display. Controversy persists over how much blood Saddam contributed to the project, or whether any of it is even his at all.

== Production and display ==
The book was produced by Abbas Shakir Joudi (Judy), an Islamic calligrapher who lived in Virginia in the United States before his death. According to his version of events, over the course of two years, Saddam donated 24–27 litres (50 to 57 pints) of his blood, which was used by Joudi to copy the 6,000 verses and some 336,000 words of the Quran. According to Joudi, Saddam Hussein summoned him to Ibn Sīnā hospital in Baghdad, where his son Uday was recovering from an assassination attempt, and asked him to write out the Quran from his blood as "a sort of vow from Saddam's side". The work was handed over to Saddam in a ceremony in September 2000.

Other reports have questioned the official Saddam Hussein government version of how much blood was donated in the making of the Quran (or if it was even Saddam's blood in the first place). Reporter Philip Smucker described the story of Saddam donating 50 pints of blood as "dubious and totally unverifiable." Smucker also wrote: "Western diplomats based in Baghdad are unimpressed with the Iraqi leader's religious devotion, dismissing the mosque and its holy book written in blood as a crude publicity stunt. 'How can we be sure this is Saddam's blood and not that of some of his victims?' one asked."

In a subsequent news report also from the UK's Telegraph newspaper, reporter David Blair stated, "In fact, a skilled artist copied the 605 pages of the holy book using Saddam Hussein's blood. The Iraqi president donated three pints over two years and this, mixed with chemicals, was used for every verse."

In December 2010 several news agencies published news articles regarding how Saddam's Blood Quran had become a contentious issue in the politics of Iraq. In one article Celso Bianco, the executive vice president for America's Blood Centers, noted the difficulty in believing the claim that Saddam donated 27 liters of blood in only a 2-year period; "The amount of donation allowed for a blood donor in the United States is five or six pints over the course of a year, or less than a gallon, Bianco said. At that safe rate, it should have taken Hussein nine years to donate all that blood, not two. 'It's an incredible amount, if that [number] is correct,' Bianco said. 'That certainly would have made him anemic.' "

The Blood Quran was displayed in a hexagonal marble building set on an artificial lake within the Mother of all Battles Mosque complex. Only invited visitors could view it, as the building was normally locked and off-limits. According to Australian journalist Paul McGeough, who saw a page, "the blood lettering is about two centimetres [¾"] tall and the broad decorative borders are dazzling – blues, light and dark; spots of red and pink; and swirling highlights in black." The Guardian's Martin Chulov describes it as "an exquisitely crafted book that would take its place in any art exhibition – if it wasn't for the fact that it was written in blood."

== After the fall of Saddam ==
Umm al-Qura Mosque, where the Blood Quran was displayed

Following the fall of Baghdad to US-led forces in April 2003, the custodians of the mosque put the Blood Quran into storage for safekeeping. The death of Saddam left the Iraqi religious and secular authorities with the dilemma of what should be done with the relics of his rule. Ali al-Moussawi, a spokesman for the prime minister, Nour al-Maliki, underscores this dilemma saying, "Not everything built during this regime we should remove. There were some sculptures however that were solely about dictatorship and control over Iraq. Some spoke to dictators and battles, and they should be removed. They have ethnic and sectarian meanings."

The majority-Shia government of post-Saddam Iraq does not want to see the re-emergence of symbols of the old regime and has established a committee to supervise their removal. Some former opponents of Saddam, such as Ahmed Chalabi, have argued for the destruction of all Saddam-era monuments and symbols on the grounds that they are "a clear reminder of the consequences of totalitarianism and idealising a person that embodies evil". Others, such as Mowaffak al-Rubaie, argue that Iraqis "need to remember [the Saddam era], all what is bad and what is good and learn lessons." The Iraqi Prime Minister's spokesman Ali al-Moussawi has proposed that the Blood Quran should be kept "as a document for the brutality of Saddam, because he should not have done this. It says a lot about him." However, he said that it should never be displayed in a museum as no Iraqi would want to see it, but it could perhaps be held in a private museum like Hitler or Stalin memorabilia.
