= John Greenwood (dentist) =

American dentist

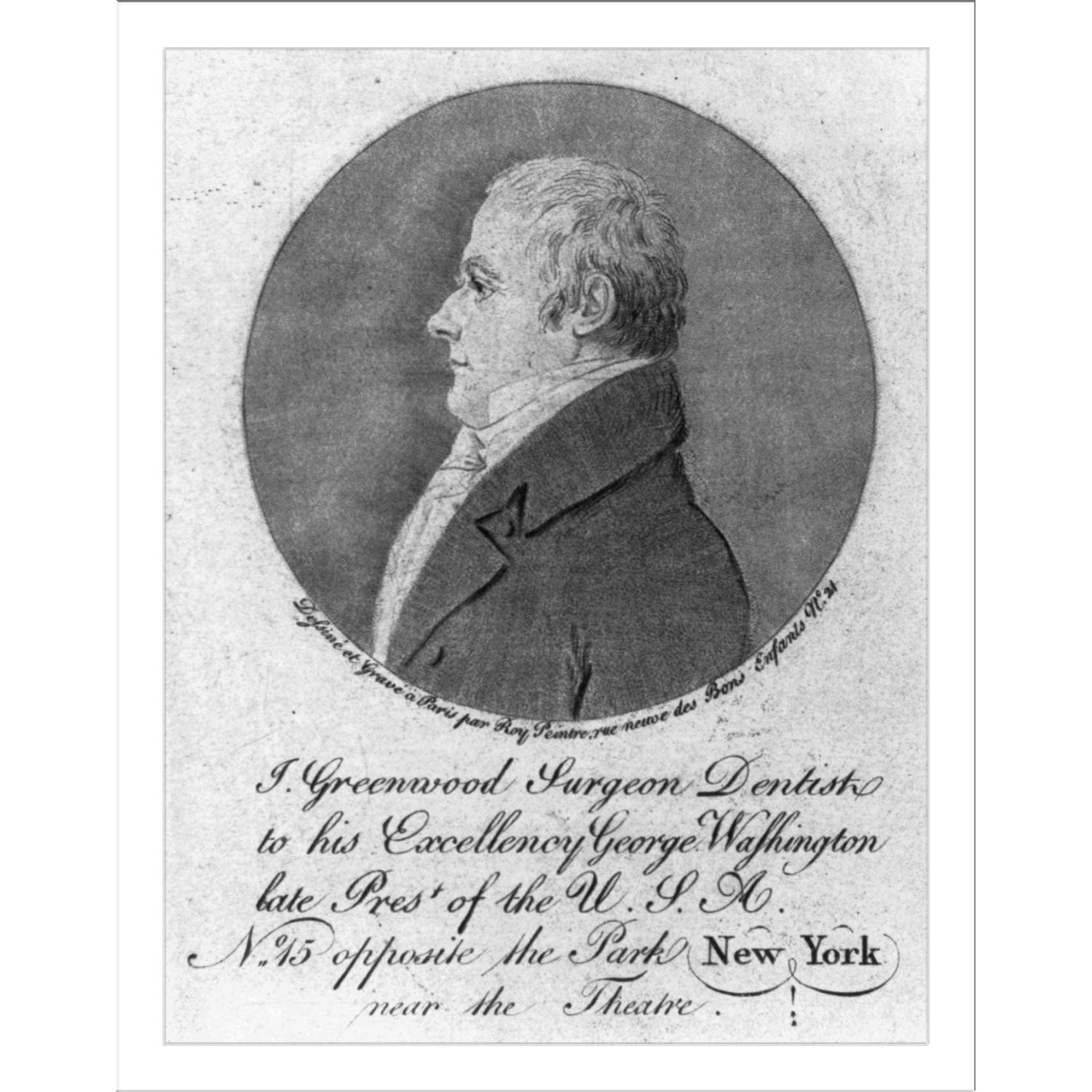
- Born: May 17, 1760; Boston, Massachusetts Bay Colony, British America
- Died: November 16, 1819 (aged 59)
- Allegiance: Continental Army
- Service years: 1775-1778
- Rank: Fifer
- Known for: Dentist of George Washington
- Conflicts: American Revolutionary War

John Greenwood (May 17, 1760 – November 16, 1819) was an American fifer and dentist, serving as George Washington's personal dentist. He was responsible for designing Washington's famous dentures, which were not wood but carved from hippopotamus tusk. He invented the first known "dental foot engine" in 1790.

Greenwood served as a fifer during the American Revolutionary War at sixteen years of age. He served twenty months in Captain Theodore Bliss's company of the 26th Massachusetts Infantry Regiment, playing the fife in the Continental Army from 1775 to 1778. He was the grandson of Isaac Greenwood, a mathematics professor at Harvard University, and son of Isaac Greenwood, the first native-born American dentist.

A letter from Greenwood to Lt. General George Washington on his denture charges, dated 1799, is in the A.D. Black History of Dentistry Collection at Northwestern University.

== Early life ==
Greenwood was born on May 17, 1760, in Boston, and lived there for most of his early life. Greenwood became close friends with Samuel Maverick, a seventeen-year-old victim of the Boston Massacre. He was excited by the musical sounds of the British regulars who had occupied Boston, and later learned to play several tunes on the fife. At sixteen, however, he was sent to Falmouth, Maine, to live with his uncle.

== American Revolutionary War ==
On April 19, 1775, the first shots of the American Revolutionary War were fired at the Battles of Lexington and Concord. In May, Greenwood heard the news and alone walked 150 miles (240 km) from Falmouth to Boston, occasionally stopping at taverns to play music for soldiers. Writing in his autobiography, he claimed that when he was asked what he was doing he said, "I was going to fight for my country".

A few months later, in June, the Continental Army was defeated in the Battle of Bunker Hill and the British Army was able to establish encampments north of Charlestown. Greenwood had heard of this while walking through Cambridge, Massachusetts, west of the battle. He witnessed struggling wounded men returning to Cambridge on foot, which initially discouraged him from continuing service. He was encouraged to continue, however, after apparently witnessing a wounded black soldier, who planned to return to battle after fixing his injuries.
