= Conrad Heinrich Fuchs =

German physician (1803–1855)

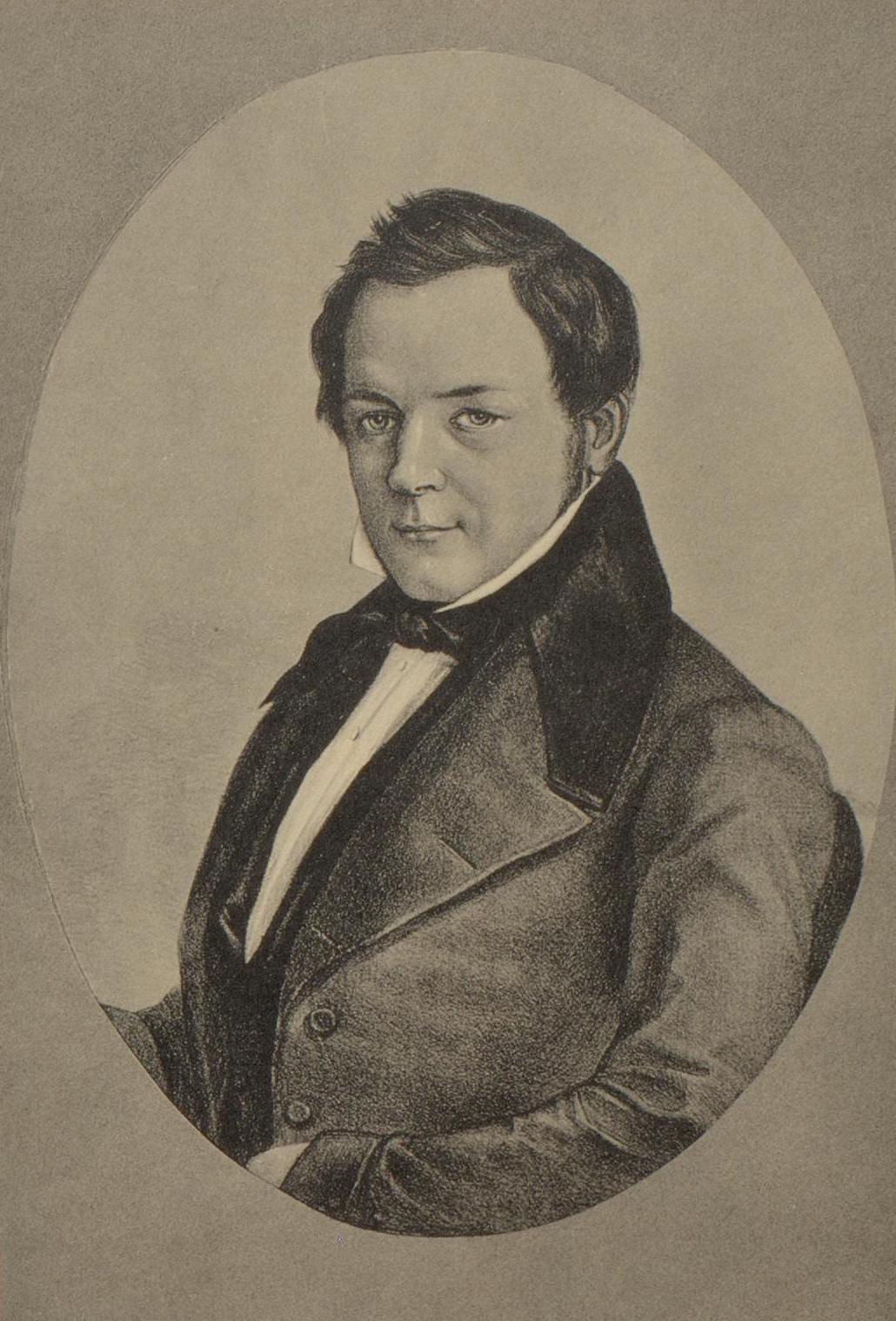
Conrad Heinrich Fuchs, Lithography by Carl Rohde

Conrad Heinrich Fuchs (7 December 1803 — 2 December 1855) was a German pathologist and historian of medicine.

== Life and career ==
Conrad Heinrich Fuchs was born in Bamberg (Bavaria) on 7 December 1803. He studied medicine at the University of Würzburg, where he was an assistant of Johann Lukas Schönlein from 1825 to 1828. He became lecturer in Würzburg in 1831, and was made full chair of pathology in 1836. In 1838, he moved to the University of Göttingen, where he was twice elected as prorector. In 1843, he was elected as member of the Royal Academy of Science in Göttingen.

Besides his work in pathology, he was well known for his research in the history of medicine.

Fuchs died in Göttingen (Kingdom of Hanover) on 2 December 1855. After his death, his brain was preserved. In 2013, the Max Planck Institute for Biophysical Chemistry in Göttingen discovered that Fuchs's brain had been mixed up for more than a century with that of the mathematician Carl Friedrich Gauss, who had died in the same year, very likely by reason of a mislabelling. So all results of Gauss's brain before 2013 actually refer to Fuchs.

== Honours ==
The Hanoverian government awarded him the honorary title "Hofrath" and the Royal Guelphic Order.

== Writings ==
- 1828: Historische Untersuchungen über Angina maligna und ihr Verhältniß zu Scharlach und Croup (in German). Würzburg.
- 1831: De lepra Arabum (in Latin). Würzburg.
- 1834: Fuchs, Conrad Heinrich. "Das heilige Feuer im Mittelalter. Ein Beitrag zur Geschichte der Epidemieen". In J. F. C. Hecker (ed.). Wissenschaftliche Annalen der gesammten Heilkunde (in German). Vol. 28. Berlin. pp. 1–81.
- 1842: Atlas der Hautkrankheiten (in German). Leiden.

== Sources ==
- Husemann, Theodor (1878). Fuchs, Konrad Heinrich. Allgemeine Deutsche Biographie (in German). Vol. 8. Leipzig: Duncker & Humblot. pp. 168–169.
