= Galileo's objective lens =

Lens used in the Galilean telescope

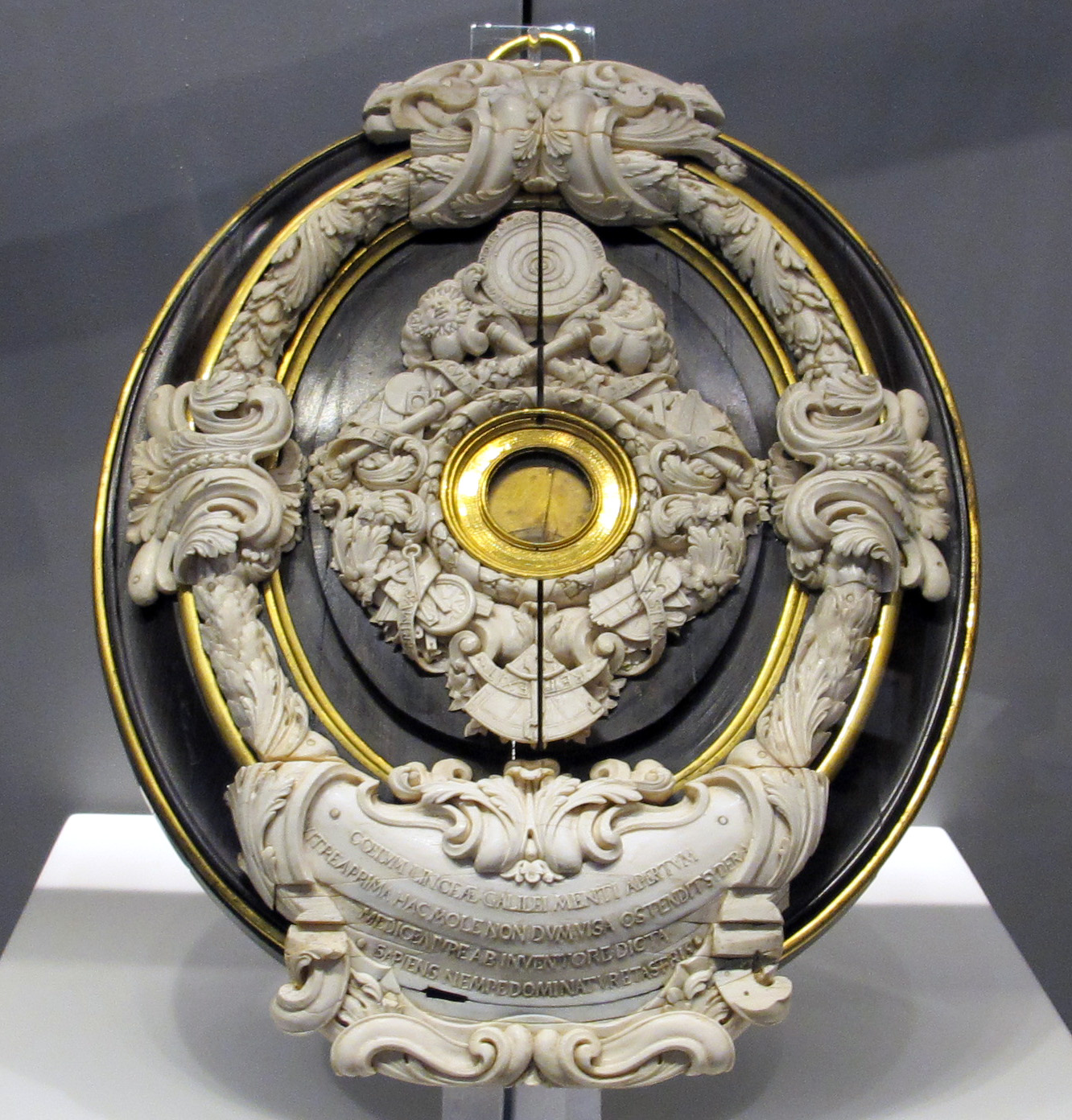
Galileo's objective lens.

Galileo's objective lens is a specific objective lens held in the Museo Galileo, Florence, Italy. It was used by Galileo Galilei in the Galilean telescope with which he discovered the four largest moons of Jupiter in 1610. The lens has a diameter of 38mm and a gilt brass housing. The frame is made of ebony and ivory and has dimensions of 410mm x 300mm.

== Frame ==
In 1677, the Medici commissioned Vittorio Crosten to build the ebony and ivory frame in which the lens has since been preserved. The frame is carved with floral motifs, images of scientific instruments and Latin inscriptions commemorating Galileo's achievements and his connection to the Medici family. A cartouche is inscribed "COELUM LINCEAE GALILEI MENTI APERTUM VITREA PRIMA HAC MOLE NONDUM VISA OSTENDIT SYDERA MEDICEA IURE AB INVENTORE DICTA SAPIENS NEMPE DOMINATUR ET ASTRIS" (The sky opened by the lynx-like thought of Galileo with this first glass lens showed stars never seen before, rightly called Medicean by their discoverer. The wise man indeed dominates the stars as well). Below the cartouche appears "VC," the initials of the engraver.

== Bibliography ==
- van Helden, Albert, ed. (1999). Catalogue of early telescopes (in Italian). Firenze: Giunti. p. 32, board n. 3. ISBN 88-09-21680-6.
- Mara Miniati, ed. (1991). Museo di storia della scienza: catalogo (in Italian). Firenze: Giunti. p. 60, boards n. 31. ISBN 88-09-20036-5.
