= Diogo Alves =

Spanish-born criminal executed in Portugal in 1841

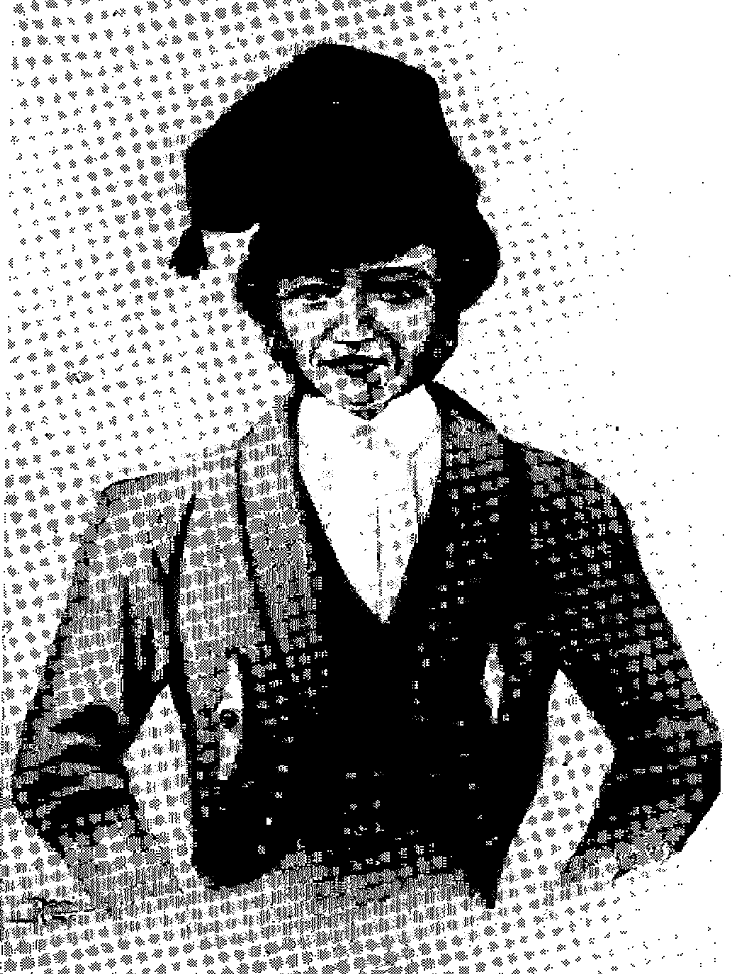
- Alves in 1840
- Born: c. 1810; Galicia, Spain
- Died: 19 February 1841; Lisbon, Portugal
- Cause of death: Hanging
- Other name: "The Aqueduct Murderer" (later nickname)
- Status: Executed
- Conviction: Murder
- Penalty: Capital punishment

Details
- Victims: 5 (confirmed), 70+ (alleged)
- Span of crimes: 1839–1839
- Country: Portugal
- State: Lisbon
- Date apprehended: 29 October 1839

Diogo Alves (c. 1810 – 19 February 1841) was a Spanish criminal executed in Portugal for his involvement in a robbery-murder case that left five people dead. Though popularly remembered today as the so-called "Aqueduct Murderer", who allegedly killed dozens of victims by throwing them off Lisbon's Águas Livres Aqueduct, this reputation is not supported by contemporary legal evidence. According to the 2025 historical investigation Seeking Diogo Alves: Fact and Fiction in Portugal's "Aqueduct Killer" by Miguel Carvalho Abrantes, Alves was never tried, charged, or even formally suspected of those supposed crimes during his lifetime.

== Early life ==
Little is known about Diogo Alves' early years. He was likely born around 1810 in Galicia, Spain. By the late 1830s, he had settled in Lisbon, working as a coachman. He became romantically involved with Gertrudes Maria, an innkeeper known as "Parreirinha", with whom he lived sporadically.

== Criminal activity and conviction ==
In October 1839, Alves was arrested and charged in connection with the robbery and murder of four individuals in the home of Dr. Pedro de Andrade. He and an accomplice were also convicted of killing a servant, Manuel Alves, to conceal the prior crime. The victims were members of a family under the doctor's care: Maria da Conceição Correia Mourão, her son José Elias, and her daughters Emília and Vicência. Alves was sentenced to death and executed on 19 February 1841 at the Cais do Tojo in Lisbon.

According to court documents and press reports of the time, no accusations were brought against Alves for any crimes at the aqueduct. Neither the public indictment (Libelo de Acusação Pública) nor the 1840 court ruling (Acórdão da Relação) mention the aqueduct or any alleged serial killings. These stories only appeared in later fictionalized accounts.

== The "Aqueduct Murderer" legend ==
Alves' reputation as the "Aqueduct Murderer" emerged only after his death. No contemporary literary, legal, or journalistic source identified him by that name, or associated him with aqueduct murders during his lifetime.

Two early works from 1841, including a poetic pamphlet (O Suplício de Diogo Alves) and a fictional dialogue (Conversação nocturna...), describe him solely as responsible for five murders. The first 19th-century text to mention aqueduct killings was Francisco António Martins Bastos' Vida e Morte de Diogo Alves, which relied on hearsay and offered no evidence.

Municipal records show that deaths at the aqueduct — possibly suicides — continued until at least 1843, and the site was not fully closed until 1852. Abrantes concludes that Diogo Alves became a convenient scapegoat for an unsolved public fear.

== The preserved head ==
A preserved human head on display at the Faculty of Medicine of the University of Lisbon has long been believed to belong to Alves. However, Abrantes demonstrates that this is almost certainly false. The head bears no physical resemblance to contemporary images of Alves; the preservation method (formaldehyde) was not used until decades after his death; and the museum's catalog system was lost in a 1978 fire. The head may have been confused with a skull once studied by Francisco Ferraz de Macedo — a different object entirely.

== Legacy and cultural references ==
Despite his limited confirmed crimes, Alves became one of Portugal's most infamous criminal figures.

- In 1911, he was the subject of Os Crimes de Diogo Alves, often cited as Portugal's first fictional film. The movie combines fact with legend.
- He appears in Portuguese comics, novels, and television programs, often portrayed as a ruthless serial killer.
- His story has been referenced in popular science discussions on phrenology and criminal anthropology.
- The book Seeking Diogo Alves: Fact and Fiction in Portugal's "Aqueduct Killer" (2025) was the first to systematically deconstruct the myth using legal records and historical documents.

== Number of victims ==
Alves was convicted of five murders: four during a robbery and a fifth to cover up the crime. No legal or testimonial evidence connects him to additional murders, and the often-cited figure of "70 victims" is a later invention.

== See also ==
- Luísa de Jesus – An 18th-century Portuguese woman executed for the murder of over two dozen infants.
- Águas Livres Aqueduct
- Capital punishment in Portugal
- List of serial killers by country

== Bibliography ==
- Miguel Carvalho Abrantes, Seeking Diogo Alves: Fact and Fiction in Portugal's "Aqueduct Killer", 2025.
- A. Leite Bastos, Crimes de Diogo Alves, 1877.
