= Marco Valenti =

Italian Roman Catholic prelate (born 1961)

The Most Reverend Marco Valenti
- Auxiliary Bishop of Rome
- Church: Catholic
- Diocese: Rome
- Appointed: 25 February 2026
- Other post: Titular Bishop of Arpi

Orders
- Ordination: 26 April 1986 by Ugo Poletti
- Consecration: 2 May 2026 by Pope Leo XIV, Baldassare Reina and Angelo De Donatis

Personal details
- Born: 28 February 1961 (age 65) Cantalupo in Sabina, Italy
- Education: Almo Collegio Capranica, Pontifical Lateran University, Pontifical Alphonsian Academy
- Motto: Sicut olive fructifera (Latin for 'Like a faithful olive tree')
- Coat of arms

Marco Valenti (born 28 February 1961) is an Italian Roman Catholic prelate serving as an Auxiliary Bishop of the Diocese of Rome and Titular Bishop of Arpi since 2026.

== Biography ==
=== Early years and priesthood ===
Valenti was born in Cantalupo in Sabina, Province of Rieti, on 28 February 1961. He attended the Pontifical Roman Minor Seminary and then the Pontifical Roman Major Seminary. He earned a bachelor's degree in philosophy from the Pontifical Lateran University in Rome and a bachelor's degree in theology from the Pontifical Gregorian University in Rome. He then earned a licentiate in Theology and a bachelor's degree in Art History from the Faculty of Letters at Sapienza University of Rome and was ordained a priest for the Diocese of Rome on 26 April 1986 at the Archbasilica of Saint John Lateran in Rome by Cardinal Ugo Poletti.

Following his ordination, he served in various pastoral and administrative capacities within the Vicariate of Rome. He was a parish vicar of Santa Maria Goretti since 1986 until 1989; parish vicar of Santa Maria Maddalena de’ Pazzi since 1990 until 1994; parish vicar of the Gran Madre di Dio since 1994 until 1996; parish priest of San Giuseppe Artigiano since 1996 until 2010; parish priest of San Saturnino since 2010 until 2024. Since 2024 until 2026 he was a parish priest of the Transfiguration parish.

=== Episcopate ===
On 25 February 2026, Pope Leo XIV appointed him as an Auxiliary Bishop of Rome, assigning him the titular see of Arpi.

Simultaneously with his appointment, the Pope issued a special pontifical decree reorganizing the internal territorial boundaries and management of the sectors of the Diocese of Rome. Under this new structural configuration, Valenti was formally assigned pastoral responsibility over the Northern Sector (Settore Nord) of the diocese. He received his episcopal consecration on 2 May 2026 at the Archbasilica of Saint John Lateran by Pope Leo XIV as a principal consecrator, with Cardinal Baldassare Reina and Cardinal Angelo De Donatis as co-consecrators.
