= Stefano Sparapani =

Italian Roman Catholic prelate (born 1956)

The Most Reverend Stefano Sparapani
- Auxiliary Bishop of Rome
- Church: Catholic
- Diocese: Rome
- Appointed: 25 February 2026
- Other post: Titular Bishop of Bisenzio

Orders
- Ordination: 4 October 1991
- Consecration: 2 May 2026 by Pope Leo XIV, Baldassare Reina and Angelo De Donatis

Personal details
- Born: 24 July 1956 (age 70) Rome, Italy
- Education: Almo Collegio Capranica, Pontifical Lateran University, Pontifical Alphonsian Academy
- Motto: Pace a voi (Italian for 'Peace to you')
- Coat of arms

Stefano Sparapani (born 24 July 1956) is an Italian Roman Catholic prelate serving as an Auxiliary Bishop of the Diocese of Rome and Titular Bishop of Bisenzio since 2026.

== Biography ==
=== Early years and priesthood ===
Sparapani was born in Rome on 24 July 1956. He earned a diploma in surveying and participated in the Opera Regina Apostolorum, an inter-parish Catholic association. He enrolled in the Faculty of Philosophy at the Pontifical Lateran University in Rome and subsequently entered the Almo Collegio Capranica, continuing his studies for a specialization in Moral Theology at the Pontifical Alphonsian Academy in Rome, and was ordained a priest for the Diocese of Rome on 4 October 1991.

Following his ordination, he served in various pastoral and administrative capacities within the Vicariate of Rome. He was a parish vicar (1991–1995) and parish priest (1995–2010) in Corviale; since 2010 he has been a parish priest of San Basilio; since 2015 he has been a spiritual director at the Almo Collegio Capranica and since 2025 he has been episcopal vicar for the Northern Sector of the city.

=== Episcopate ===
On 25 February 2026, Pope Leo XIV appointed him as an Auxiliary Bishop of Rome, assigning him the titular see of Bisenzio.

Simultaneously with his appointment, the Pope issued a special pontifical decree reorganizing the internal territorial boundaries and management of the sectors of the Diocese of Rome. Under this new structural configuration, Sparapani was formally assigned pastoral responsibility over the West Sector (Settore Ovest) of the diocese. He received his episcopal consecration on 2 May 2026 at the Archbasilica of Saint John Lateran by Pope Leo XIV as a principal consecrator, with Cardinal Baldassare Reina and Cardinal Angelo De Donatis as co-consecrators.
