= Alessandro Zenobbi =

Italian Roman Catholic prelate (born 1969)

The Most Reverend Alessandro Zenobbi
- Auxiliary Bishop of Rome
- Church: Catholic Church
- Diocese: Rome
- Appointed: 25 February 2026
- Other post: Titular Bishop of Biccari

Orders
- Ordination: 28 April 1996 by Pope John Paul II
- Consecration: 2 May 2026 by Pope Leo XIV, Baldassare Reina and Angelo De Donatis

Personal details
- Born: 10 November 1969 (age 56) Rome, Italy
- Education: Pontifical Roman Major Seminary
- Motto: In Deo confidens (Latin for 'Confiding in God')
- Coat of arms

Alessandro Zenobbi (born 10 November 1969) is an Italian Roman Catholic prelate serving as an Auxiliary Bishop of the Diocese of Rome and Titular Bishop of Biccari since 2026.

== Biography ==
=== Early years and priesthood ===
Zenobbi was born in Rome on 10 November 1969. He completed his studies for the priesthood at the Pontifical Roman Major Seminary and was ordained a priest for the Diocese of Rome on 28 April 1996 by Pope John Paul II in St. Peter's Basilica.

Following his ordination, he served in various pastoral and administrative capacities within the Vicariate of Rome. He was a parish vicar since 1996 until 2008 and a parish priest since 2008 until 2017 of San Policarpo. Since 2017, he was a parish priest of Santa Lucia a Piazza d'Armi and, since 2025, episcopal vicar for the Western Sector of Rome.

=== Episcopate ===
On 25 February 2026, Pope Leo XIV appointed him as an Auxiliary Bishop of Rome, assigning him the titular see of Biccari.

Simultaneously with his appointment, the Pope issued a special pontifical decree reorganizing the internal territorial boundaries and management of the sectors of the Diocese of Rome. Under this new structural configuration, Zenobbi was formally assigned pastoral responsibility over the Eastern Sector (Settore Est) of the diocese. He received his episcopal consecration on 2 May 2026 at the Archbasilica of Saint John Lateran by Pope Leo XIV as a principal consecrator, with Cardinal Baldassare Reina and Cardinal Angelo De Donatis as co-consecrators.
