= Daniele Libanori =

Italian Catholic prelate (born 1953)

The Most Reverend Daniele Libanori S.J.
- Assessor of the Holy Father for Consecrated Life
- Church: Catholic Church; Latin Church
- Appointed: 6 April 2024
- Other post: Titular Bishop of Buruni (2017‍–‍present)
- Previous posts: Auxiliary Bishop of Rome (2018‍–‍2024); Rector of the Church of the Gesù (2008‍–‍2016)

Orders
- Ordination: 11 June 1977
- Consecration: 13 January 2018 by Angelo De Donatis

Personal details
- Born: Daniele Libanori; 27 May 1953 (age 73) Ostellato, Ferrara, Italy
- Motto: In lumine fidei (Latin for 'In the light of faith')
- Coat of arms

Styles of Daniele Libanori
- Reference style: The Most Reverend
- Spoken style: Your Excellency
- Religious style: Monsignor

Daniele Libanori SJ (born 27 May 1953) is an Italian prelate of the Catholic Church who serves as assessor of the Holy Father for consecrated life, an office in the Roman Curia created for him in 2024. He was an auxiliary bishop of Rome from 2018 to 2024, responsible from 2019 for the diocese's central sector and for its clergy and seminaries, and has been titular bishop of Buruni since 2017.

Libanori spent his first years of ministry as a parish priest and rector of the seminary of the Archdiocese of Ferrara-Comacchio before joining the Jesuits in 1991, and was rector of the Church of the Gesù in Rome from 2008 to 2016. As a church investigator and commissioner he governed several religious communities placed under Vatican administration. He came to international attention in December 2022, when he stated that abuse allegations made by women religious against the Slovenian Jesuit Marko Rupnik were true; the resulting break with the Cardinal Vicar of Rome, Angelo De Donatis, has been widely reported as the background to the simultaneous reassignment of both men in April 2024.

== Early life, education and priesthood ==
Daniele Libanori was born on 27 May 1953 in Ostellato in the province of Ferrara, in the Archdiocese of Ferrara-Comacchio, and entered the archdiocesan seminary of Ferrara in 1964. He was ordained a priest of the Archdiocese of Ferrara-Comacchio on 11 June 1977.

As a diocesan priest, Libanori was assistant priest of the parish of Vigarano Mainarda from 1977 to 1983 and then, until 1991, parish priest of Madonna dei Boschi and rector of the archdiocesan seminary of Ferrara. (Note: Official sources give different dates for these years. The Holy See Press Office bulletin of 23 November 2017 gives 1977–1983 as assistant priest at Vigarano Mainarda and 1983–1991 as parish priest of Madonna dei Boschi and rector of the seminary. The biography formerly published on the website of the Diocese of Rome gives 1977–1979 as assistant priest, 1979–1983 as parish priest and 1982–1991 as rector. This article follows the bulletin.) He received a licentiate in theology of evangelisation from the Bologna Theological Institute and a doctorate in theology of the Christian life from the Pontifical Theological Faculty of Southern Italy, San Luigi section, in Naples.

== Jesuit ==
Libanori was received into the Society of Jesus on 26 December 1991. He served in university ministry in L'Aquila at the Collegio Universitario d'Abruzzo and its university chapel from 1993 to 1997, then spent a year in the Jesuit community of Posillipo in Naples, and from 1998 to 2003 worked in the chaplaincy of the Sapienza University in Rome. He made his final vows on 18 October 2002.

He was vice-rector of the Church of the Gesù from 2003 to 2008 and its rector from 2008 to 2016, after which he headed the national office of the Apostleship of Prayer. In September 2017 he became rector of the church of San Giuseppe dei Falegnami at the Roman Forum and a member of the diocesan office for the continuing formation of the clergy. At the time of his appointment as a bishop, the magazine Formiche noted that Libanori was known in Rome as an exorcist.

On 30 August 2018 the gilded coffered ceiling of San Giuseppe dei Falegnami collapsed. The church was closed at the time and nobody was hurt; the technical office of the Vicariate of Rome described the collapse as sudden and without prior warning signs. Prosecutors in Rome investigated the owner and the site manager of the firm that had carried out restoration work on the roof in 2015 on suspicion of negligent collapse (crollo colposo).

== Auxiliary Bishop of Rome ==
On 23 November 2017, Pope Francis appointed Libanori an auxiliary bishop of Rome and titular bishop of Buruni. He received his episcopal consecration in the Lateran Basilica on 13 January 2018 from the vicar general of Rome, Archbishop Angelo De Donatis, together with Paolo Ricciardi, who was appointed at the same time; the co-consecrators were Bishops Gianrico Ruzza, an auxiliary bishop of Rome, and Andrea Turazzi, Bishop of San Marino-Montefeltro.

He was named a member of the Congregation for the Causes of Saints on 14 April 2018. On 24 May 2019 Libanori succeeded Gianrico Ruzza as the auxiliary bishop responsible for the central sector of the diocese and was made diocesan delegate for the clergy and the seminaries.

On 12 March 2020, because of the COVID-19 pandemic, Cardinal De Donatis ordered the closure of all churches in Rome; the decree met with incomprehension among Roman clergy and was largely withdrawn the following day at the request of Pope Francis. On 19 March 2020 Libanori addressed a letter to the priests of his sector, published by La Civiltà Cattolica as "La fede al tempo di Covid-19" ("Faith at the time of Covid-19"). He called for the situation to be judged without emotional reactions, wrote that "it is not for the Church but for the State to legislate on matters of public health", and argued that in an emergency faith and devotion must find new ways, worship being offered "in spirit and truth".

== Commissioner of religious communities ==
=== Priestly Fraternity Familia Christi ===
Following a canonical visitation held from 20 to 22 February 2018, the president of the Pontifical Commission Ecclesia Dei, Cardinal Luis Ladaria Ferrer, appointed Libanori plenipotentiary commissioner of the Priestly Fraternity Familia Christi on 1 December 2018. The community, based in the Archdiocese of Ferrara-Comacchio, had been erected in 2014 by Archbishop Luigi Negri as an association of the faithful and raised in 2016 to a society of apostolic life; the intervention followed tensions with the archdiocese, the fraternity's attachment to the traditional form of the Mass and questions about its priestly formation.

On 20 June 2019 Libanori ordered the closure of the fraternity's house of studies and novitiate with effect from 1 July 2019. A decree of the Congregation for the Doctrine of the Faith dated 13 December 2019, confirmed by Pope Francis in forma specifica on 6 February 2020, suppressed the fraternity.

=== Loyola Community ===
Libanori conducted the apostolic visitation of the Loyola Community, a Slovenian community of women religious co-founded in Ljubljana in the 1980s by Marko Rupnik and Sister Ivanka Hosta. The visitation concluded in February 2020, and in October 2020 he assumed the governance of the community as commissioner. The inquiry had originally been prompted by complaints about the exercise of authority within the community.

In the course of individual conversations with the sisters, allegations of sexual and spiritual abuse against Rupnik emerged. At least nine women lodged complaints, and Libanori forwarded their statements, which he assessed as credible, to the Vatican.

In June 2023 Hosta was sanctioned for a style of government held to be detrimental to the dignity and rights of the community's members; the penalties included removal from any position of governance and a three-year ban on contact with members. According to the German Catholic news agency KNA, the disciplinary decree was imposed by Libanori. A decree signed on 20 October 2023 suppressed the Loyola Community, which was required to complete its dissolution within one year, citing serious problems concerning the exercise of authority and community life.

=== Pro Deo et Fratribus – Family of Mary ===
By a decree of the Dicastery for the Clergy dated 5 June 2022 and approved by Pope Francis in forma specifica, the governance of the association Pro Deo et Fratribus – Family of Mary and of the Work of Jesus the High Priest was entrusted to a papal commissioner in the person of Libanori, with Sister Katarína Krištofová as co-commissioner. The commissioner's task was to govern the community until conditions allowed ordinary governance to be restored.

== Rupnik case and conflict within the Vicariate of Rome ==
In December 2022 it became public that Rupnik had been excommunicated for a time in 2020. Days later Libanori wrote a letter to priests, obtained by the Associated Press, stating that the women's accounts were true and that they had "seen their lives ruined by the evil suffered and by the complicit silence" of the Church. In February 2023 he gave an interview to La Croix in which he called for those affected to be heard by the church authorities.

Libanori's position placed him at odds with the leadership of the Vicariate of Rome. Cardinal De Donatis had stated that the Vicariate had learned of the allegations only recently and had defended the Centro Aletti, the art and theology centre associated with Rupnik. In September 2023 a letter from the leadership of the diocese praising the centre drew widespread criticism. According to KNA, Libanori defended those affected and protested against his superior, and the episode exposed the tensions within the diocesan leadership. Rupnik was dismissed from the Society of Jesus in June 2023 and remains the subject of a Vatican investigation.

== Assessor for Consecrated Life ==
On 6 April 2024 Pope Francis appointed Libanori to the newly created office of assessor of the Holy Father for consecrated life; on the same day De Donatis was appointed Major Penitentiary. The appointment ended his service as an auxiliary bishop of Rome.

Reporting on the double appointment connected it to the dispute at the head of the Vicariate. America wrote that Libanori's reassignment "had been rumored for some time as he seems to have upset some in Rome with that investigation", and that the nature of the new role remained unclear. KNA described the newly created post as an office with an unclear remit and suggested that the assertive Libanori may have made "too much of a fuss about a case" for the pope. Several Italian outlets described the move with the formula promoveatur ut amoveatur ("let him be promoted in order to be removed").

No successor was appointed for the central sector, for which the Vicariate named Francesco Pesce as coordinator. By the motu proprio La vera bellezza of 1 October 2024 Pope Francis abolished the central sector, merging its five prefectures into the four remaining sectors of the diocese.
