= Andrea Carlevale =

Italian Roman Catholic prelate (born 1971)

The Most Reverend Andrea Carlevale
- Auxiliary Bishop of Rome
- Church: Catholic Church
- Diocese: Rome
- Appointed: 25 February 2026
- Other post: Titular Bishop of Atella

Orders
- Ordination: 3 May 1998 by Pope John Paul II
- Consecration: 2 May 2026 by Pope Leo XIV, Baldassare Reina and Angelo De Donatis

Personal details
- Born: 8 April 1971 (age 55) Rome, Italy
- Education: Pontifical Roman Major Seminary
- Motto: Discepolo e servo della Sapienza Incarnata (Italian for 'Disciple and servant of the Incarnate Wisdom')
- Coat of arms

Andrea Carlevale (born 8 April 1971) is an Italian Roman Catholic prelate serving as an Auxiliary Bishop of the Diocese of Rome and Titular Bishop of Atella since 2026.

== Biography ==
=== Early years and priesthood ===
Carlevale was born in Rome on 8 April 1971. He completed his studies for the priesthood at the Pontifical Roman Major Seminary and was ordained a priest for the Diocese of Rome on 3 May 1998 by Pope John Paul II in St. Peter's Basilica.

Following his ordination, he served in various pastoral and administrative capacities within the Vicariate of Rome. He was the parish vicar of Santa Galla alla Garbatella from 1998 to 2003, and subsequently of Sant'Ireneo a Centocelle from 2003 to 2009. He then spent six years as an assistant at the Pontifical Roman Major Seminary (2009–2015) before serving as the parish priest of Santa Maria di Loreto in Castelverde-Lunghezza from 2015 to 2025. In 2025, he was appointed parish priest of San Giovanni Battista de Rossi.

=== Episcopate ===
On 25 February 2026, Pope Leo XIV appointed him as an Auxiliary Bishop of Rome, assigning him the titular see of Atella.

Simultaneously with his appointment, the Pope issued a special pontifical decree reorganizing the internal territorial boundaries and management of the sectors of the Diocese of Rome. Under this new structural configuration, Carlevale was formally assigned pastoral responsibility over the South Sector (Settore Sud) of the diocese. He received his episcopal consecration on 2 May 2026 at the Archbasilica of Saint John Lateran by Pope Leo XIV as a principal consecrator, with Cardinal Baldassare Reina and Cardinal Angelo De Donatis as co-consecrators.
