= Dieci =

Dieci may refer to:

- Dieci, Arad, commune in Arad County, Romania
- Dieci (song), song by Italian singer Annalisa
- Enzo Dieci (born 1934), Italian prelate of the Roman Catholic Church

== See also ==
- Deci
