= Pontifical Lateran University =

Pontifical university in Rome

- Type: Public, Catholic, Pontifical
- Established: 1773; 253 years ago
- Rector: Archbishop Alfonso V. Amarante, C.SS.R.
- Location: Rome, Italy, but partially extraterritorial of the Holy See; 41°53′11″N 12°30′18″E
- Grand Chancellor: Cardinal Baldassare Reina
- Website: www.pul.va/en/
- Location on a map of Rome

The Pontifical Lateran University (Italian: Pontificia Università Lateranense; Latin: Pontificia Universitas Lateranensis), also known as Lateranum, is a pontifical university based in Rome. The university also hosts the central session of the Pontifical John Paul II Institute for Studies on Marriage and Family. The university is known as "The Pope's University". Its Grand Chancellor is the Vicar General to the Holy Father for the Diocese of Rome. As of 2014 the Pontifical Lateran university had students from more than a hundred countries. It is also sometimes also known as the Pontifical University of Apollinaire.

== History ==
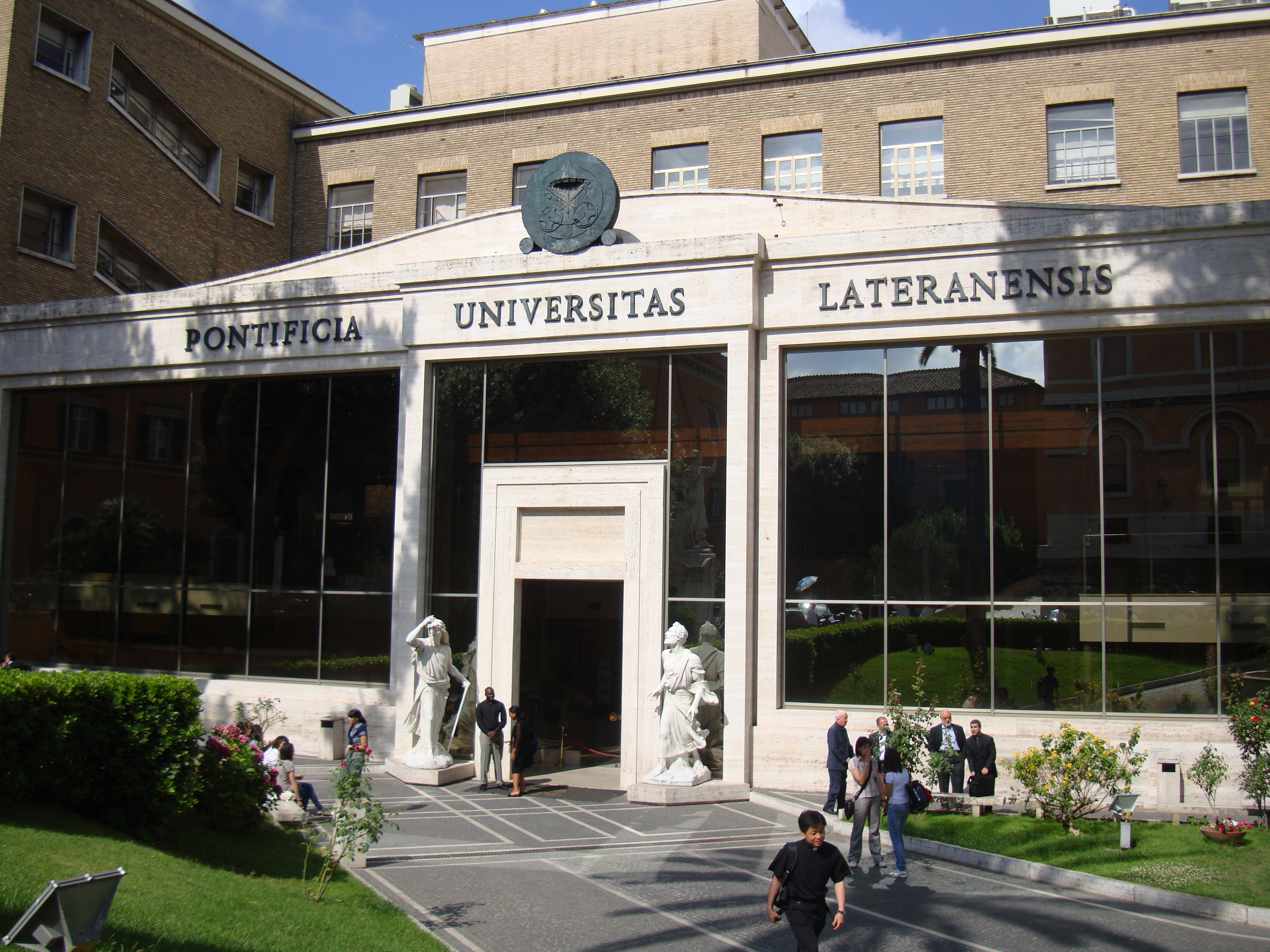
Pontifical Lateran University

=== 18th century ===
The present Pontifical Lateran University was founded in 1773 by Pope Clement XIV after he had suppressed the Society of Jesus, and officially entrusted the secular clergy of the Diocese of Rome with the mission to teach theology and philosophy to seminarians of the diocese.

=== 19th century ===
In 1824, Pope Leo XII restored the Jesuits and returned to them the Roman College. The diocesan seminary was relocated to the Palace of Sant’Apollinare. In 1853, Pope Pius IX founded the Faculty of Canon Law and Civil law and the Pontifical Institute Utriusque Iuris. The College was known as Ateneo del Pontificio Seminario Romano.

=== 20th century ===
Pope Pius XI gave the Ateneo its permanent seat at the Basilica of St. John Lateran. Pope Pius XII in 1958 established the Pontifical Institute Pastorale. The following year, Pope John XXIII erected the institute into a university and gave it the name of the Pontifical Lateran University.

In 1981, Pope John Paul II founded, in the university, the Pontifical Institute for Studies on Marriage and Family, which has the right to confer academic degrees.

=== 21st century ===
In September 2017, Pope Francis modified its mission, renaming it the John Paul II Pontifical Theological Institute for Marriage and Family Sciences. The institute has the authority to award its own academic degrees.

In 2001, the Lateran University Press was established to publish scientific publications and seven magazines.

In 2018, Vincenzo Buonomo, a professor of international law and a consultant to the Holy See since the 1980s, was appointed rector of the Pontifical Lateran University by Pope Francis. Buonomo is the first lay person appointed to that position.

== Structure ==
The grand chancellor is, under the statutes of the university, the vicar general of His Holiness for the Diocese of Rome.

=== Grand chancellors ===
- Camillo Ruini (1 July 1991 – 27 June 2008)
- Agostino Vallini (27 June 2008 – 26 May 2017)
- Angelo De Donatis (26 May 2017 – present)

=== Rectors ===
- Pietro Rossano (1982–1991)
- Umberto Betti, O.F.M. (1991–1995)
- Angelo Scola (1995–2002)
- Salvatore Fisichella (2002–2010)
- Enrico dal Covolo, S.D.B. (2010–2018)
- Vincenzo Buonomo (2018–2023)
- Alfonso V. Amarante, C.SS.R. (2023 – present)

=== Faculties ===
The university is divided into four faculties: Philosophy, Theology, Canon Law, and Civil law. The University is one of the few places that offers a doctorate Utriusque Iuris, i.e., in both civil and church law. The Pastoral Institute "Redemptor Hominis" trains future teachers for teaching in seminaries and theological institutes as well as pastoral workers who are experts in the various fields of ecclesial life. In 2015, the Lateran and Villanova University's Center for Church Management and Business Ethics formed a cooperative program whereby students from each university can take courses online and study at the other institution.

According to the Decree of the Ministry of university and Scientific Research of the Italian Republic of 21 September 2006, implementing Law No. 63, March 5, 2004, the Laurea in Law (L/31) and Laurea Magistrale in Law (LMG/01) are equivalent to degrees issued by Italian universities.

In October 2021 Pope Francis established an interdisciplinary study cycle on Ecology and the Environment with a UNESCO chair on "the future of education for sustainability".

=== Library ===
The library of the Pontifical Lateran University – "Library of Blessed Pius IX", known originally as the "Biblioteca Pia" – was founded by Pope Pius IX in 1854. The history of the library is connected directly to the foundation of the university at its original seat at St. Apollinare in Rome. The library is in fact a collection of smaller libraries from various ecclesial and academic institutes in Rome which have been amalgamated to form the present library. The library consists of collections from the private libraries of Pope Gregory XIII, Pope Pius IX, Pope Pius XII, the German College, the monastery of SS. Bonifacio and Alessio on the Aventine, and the library of the Geronimiani fathers. Successively various ex-alumni have contributed to the library. A new building for the housing of the library and reading room was built and officially inaugurated by Pope Benedict XVI on 21 October 2007. As of 2014 the library had some 600,000 books and a collection of 40,000 rare and antique volumes.

=== Theological Institute of Assisi ===
The university is linked to university Pastoral Institute Redemptor Hominis and the Theological Institute of Assisi. The Theological Institute of Assisi is a training college established in 1971 in Assisi in the structures of Saint Francis sharing the premises of the Sacred Convent with the community of Friars Minor Conventual. The institute also has a documentation center. Since 1993, it is attached to the Faculty of Theology at the Pontifical University Lateran, and serves as the academic institution designed to train students in theology. It organizes courses of studies leading to diplomas of Bachelor of Sacred Theology and Licentiate of Sacred Theology, and Franciscan studies for those wishing to be recruited into church office or intending to teach the Catholic religion in schools.

As of 2014 the institute was chaired by John Bishop Hats.
