= Santa Maria Assunta e San Giuseppe a Primavalle =

- Church of Saint Mary Assumed and Saint Joseph in Primavalle
- Chiesa Parrocchiale di Santa Maria Assunta e San Giuseppe
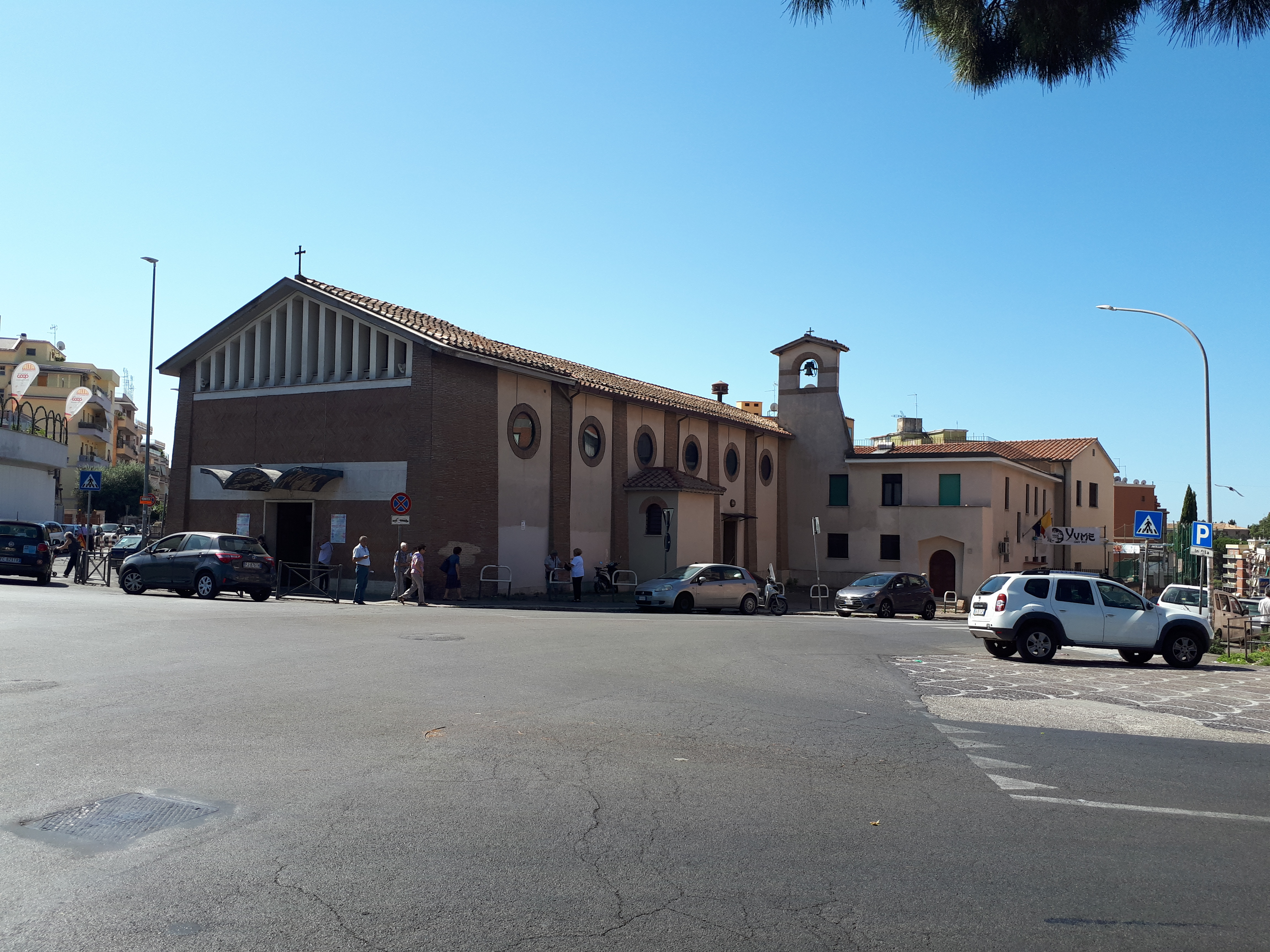

- Location within Rome
- 41°54′49″N 12°24′52″E
- Location: Via dei Monti di Primavalle 3, Primavalle, Rome
- Country: Italy
- Language: Italian
- Denomination: Catholic
- Tradition: Roman Rite
- Religious order: Poor Servants of Divine Providence
- Website: primavalle.org

History
- Status: titular church, parish church
- Dedication: Assumption of Mary and Saint Joseph
- Consecrated: 3 June 1933

Architecture
- Functional status: active
- Architect(s): Tullio Rossi and Renato Costa
- Architectural type: Modern
- Years built: 1932–53

Administration
- Diocese: Rome

Santa Maria Assunta e San Giuseppe a Primavalle is a 20th-century parochial church and titular church in western Rome, dedicated to Mary and Joseph.

== History ==
Santa Maria Assunta e San Giuseppe a Primavalle was built in 1932–1953 to a modernist design by Tullio Rossi and Renato Costa. Pope John Paul II visited in 1994.

On 7 December 2024, Pope Francis made it a titular church to be held by a cardinal-priest.

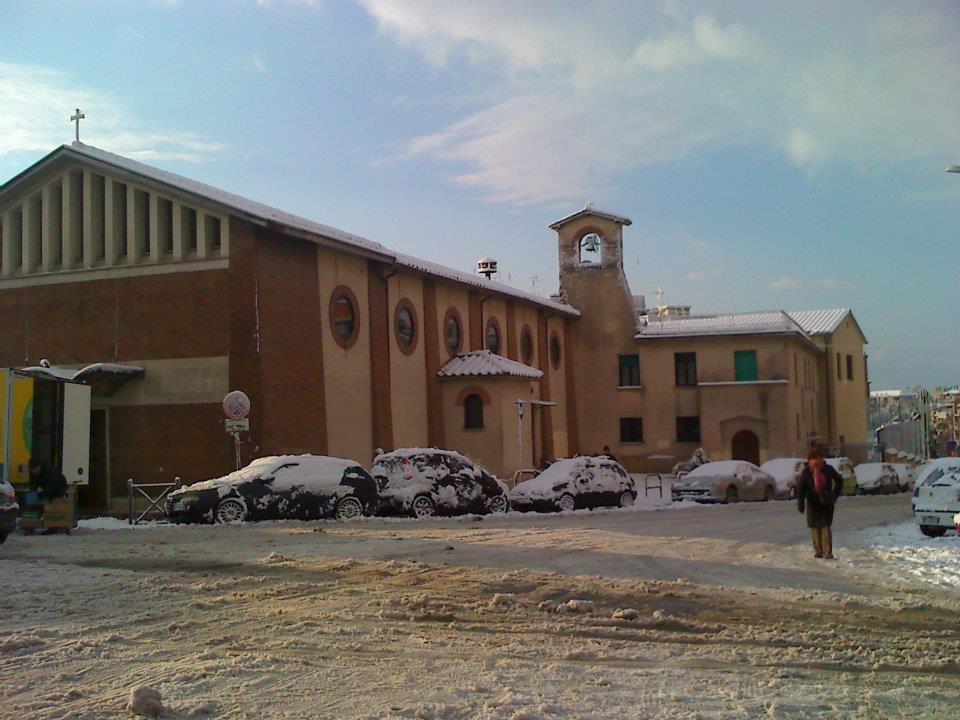
The church in the snow, 2012

Cardinal-protectors

- Baldassare Reina (2024 – present)
