= Buruni (North Africa) =

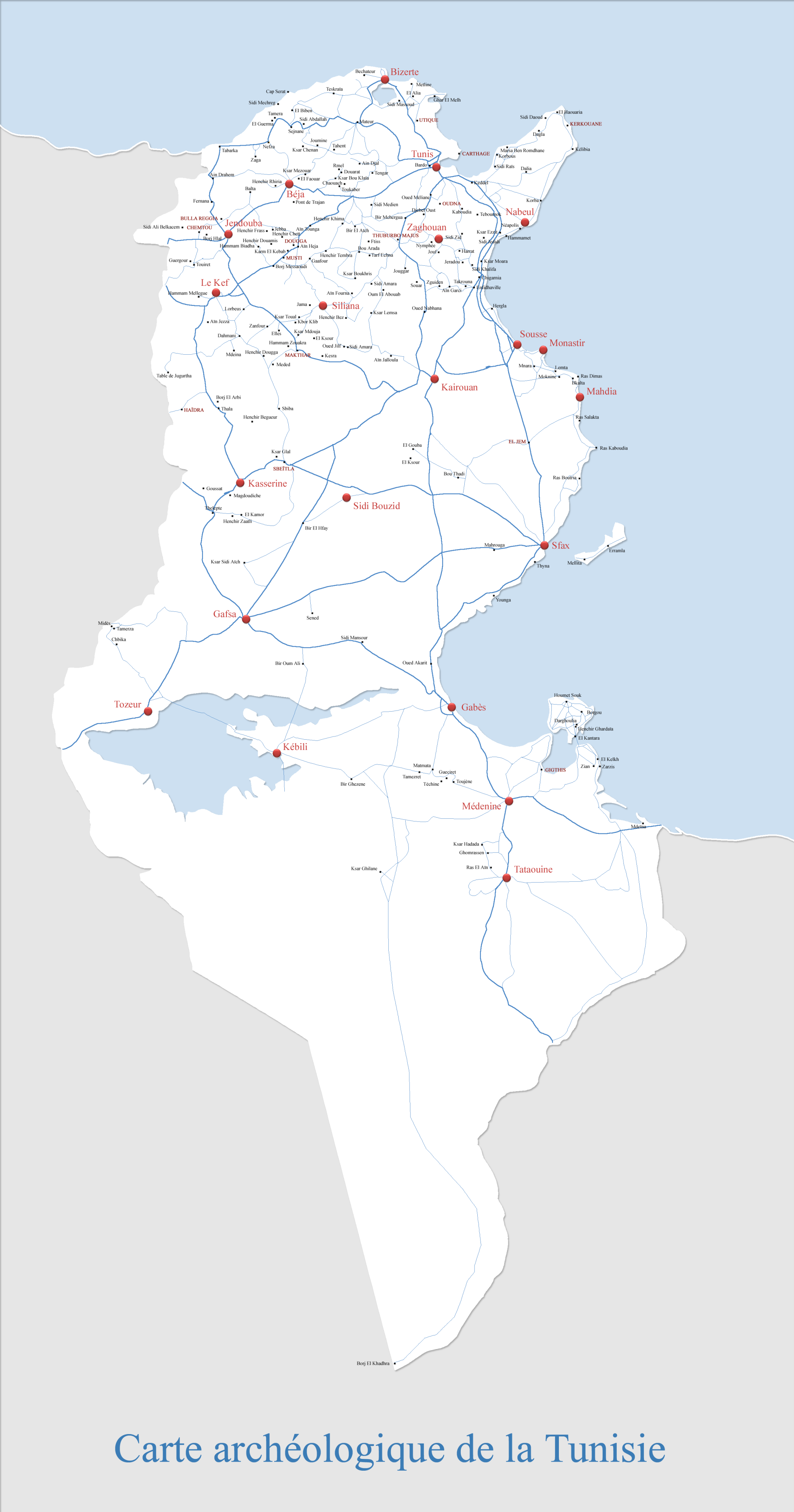
Archaeology map of Tunisia

Buruni is an ancient city of the Maghreb, in North Africa. The city has been identified with ruins at Henchir-El-Dakhla in Tunisia.

== History ==
Buruni, was an ancient Roman city of the Bagradas Valley identifiable with Henchir-El-Dakhla in modern Tunisia. There is no record of the city in Punic or pre Roman Berber, times, and is presumed to be a Roman foundation, probably of coloni status.

The Bagradis valley became Roman after the Third Punic War about 146BC and it quickly became an important region for agriculture, with the rolling plains home to numerous Imperial estates. The area around Buruni fell to the Vandal Kingdom around 423 and for a century was ruled by the Arian kings until in 533 the Orthodox Byzantines replaced them.

The area was held by Byzantium until the Muslim conquest of the Maghreb in the end of the 7th century.

=== Saltus Burunitanus ===
The saltus burunitanus (CIL VIII 10570 = ILS 6870) is an ancient Roman era document. The document is a letter of reply from emperor Commodus regarding a complain by a group of peasants on an imperial estate in Buruni complaining of maltreatment by the estate manager. One Lurius Lucullus, wrote on behalf of the peasants that the procurator of the estate had arrested and flogged some of the workers even those who were Roman citizens.

The document names one official Allius Maximus, an official of the rank of conductor, as subject of the major part of the complaint. The text was published in 1880, by Dr. Dummartin, was one of dozen similar petitions to the emperor at the time. The Saltus Burunitanus shines a light on the social structure and lifestyles of Roman North Africa in the early empire. A time when the Maghreb was much more fertile and supported a much larger population, than today.

=== Bishopric ===
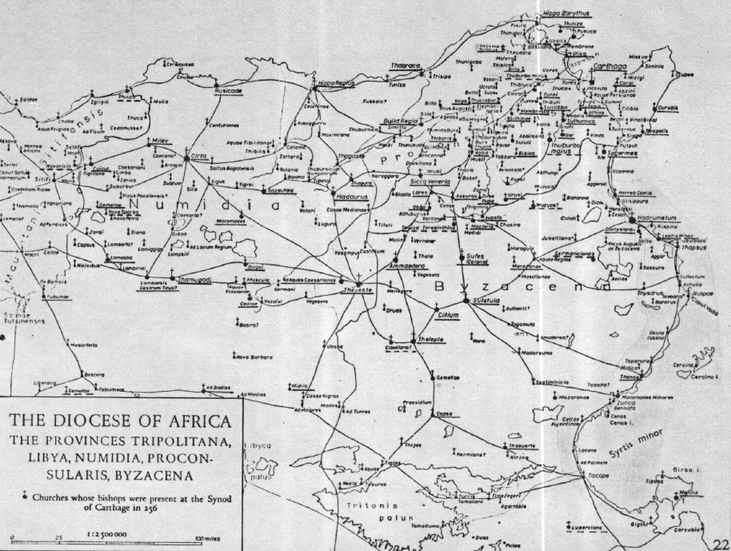
Dioceses of Africa, 256.

Some time after Commodus a Christian community formed in the city which was known as the episcopus Buronitanus. The community developed as an ancient Latin Rite Bishopric of the Roman province of Africa Proconsolare, suffragan of the Archdiocese of Carthage. The only bishop of Buruni known to us, was Fausto, a Catholic mentioned at the end of the 5th century by Victor of Vita in his history of the Vandal persecution.

Today the diocese of Buruni survives as titular see of the Catholic Church. The current bishop is Daniele Libanori.

Known bishops

- Fausto † (mentioned in the 5th century)
- Pius Anthony Benincasa (8 May 1964 – 13 August 1986)
- Ernesto Antolin Salgado (17 October 1986 –7 December 2000)
- Ismael Rueda Sierra (20 December 2000 – 27 June 2003)
- Anthony Fisher, O.P. (16 June 2003 – 8 January 2010)
- Raphael Thattil (15 January 2010 – 10 October 2017)
- Daniele Libanori, S.J. (since 23 November 2017).

== See also ==
- Lex Manciana
