= Antonio Rosario Mennonna =

Roman Catholic Prelate

Styles of Antonio Mennonna
- Reference style: The Most Reverend
- Spoken style: Your Excellency
- Religious style: Monsignor
- Posthumous style: none

Antonio Rosario Mennonna (May 27, 1906 – November 6, 2009) was an Italian prelate of the Roman Catholic Church. At the time of his death at the age of 103, he was the second-oldest bishop in the Church, behind Antoine Nguyên Van Thien.

Born in Muro Lucano, he was ordained to the priesthood on August 12, 1928.

On January 5, 1955, Mennonna was appointed Bishop of Muro Lucano by Pope Pius XII. He received his episcopal consecration on the following March 13 from Archbishop Domenico Picchinenna, with Bishop Matteo Sperandeo and Archbishop Augusto Bertazzoni serving as co-consecrators.

Mennonna was named Bishop of Nardò on February 22, 1962, later resigning after 19 years of service on September 30, 1983. He died on November 6, 2009.
