= Enzo Dieci =

Catholic bishop

Styles of Enzo Dieci
- Reference style: The Most Reverend
- Spoken style: Your Excellency
- Religious style: Monsignor
- Posthumous style: not applicable

Enzo Dieci (born 28 January 1934) is an Italian prelate of the Roman Catholic Church, who left Rome in December 2009 and currently serves 35 km from Lima in the Church of the Sagrado Corazon de Jesus. Born in Sassuolo, Dieci was ordained to the priesthood on 17 March 1962.

On 7 April 1992, he was appointed Titular Bishop of Maura and an Auxiliary Bishop of Rome. Dieci received his episcopal consecration on the following 26 April from Pope John Paul II, with Cardinals Franciszek Macharski and Angelo Sodano serving as co-consecrators.

Dieci served as an auxiliary of Rome, assisting the Cardinal Vicar, then Agostino Vallini, in the day-to-day administration of the diocese, which is delegated to the cardinal vicar by the Pope. Dieci also served as delegate for missionary cooperation among Churches.
