= Lipsanotheca =

Container for relics

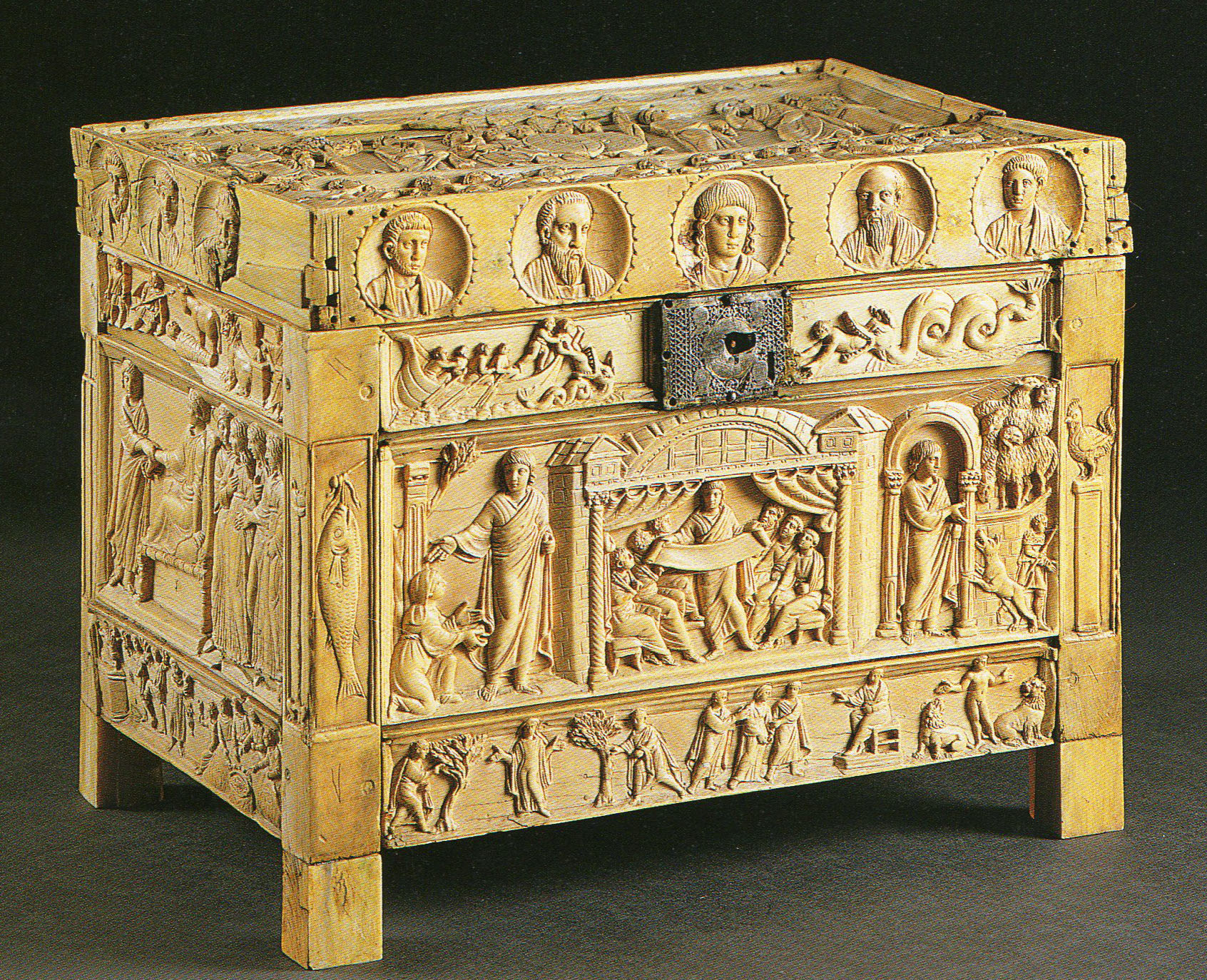
The Brescia Casket

A lipsanotheca (Italian lipsanoteca) is a reliquary, specifically a small box containing the actual relics inside a reliquary. The term derives from Greek through Late Latin. It has also come to be applied to monumental displays of relics.

In modern English, it usually refers to a small number of individual very old reliquaries, most often the 4th century ivory Brescia Casket, which is the most likely meaning of the plain term, especially in its Italian version. A 13th century wooden box in Alicante, Spain, is also called a lipsanotheca.

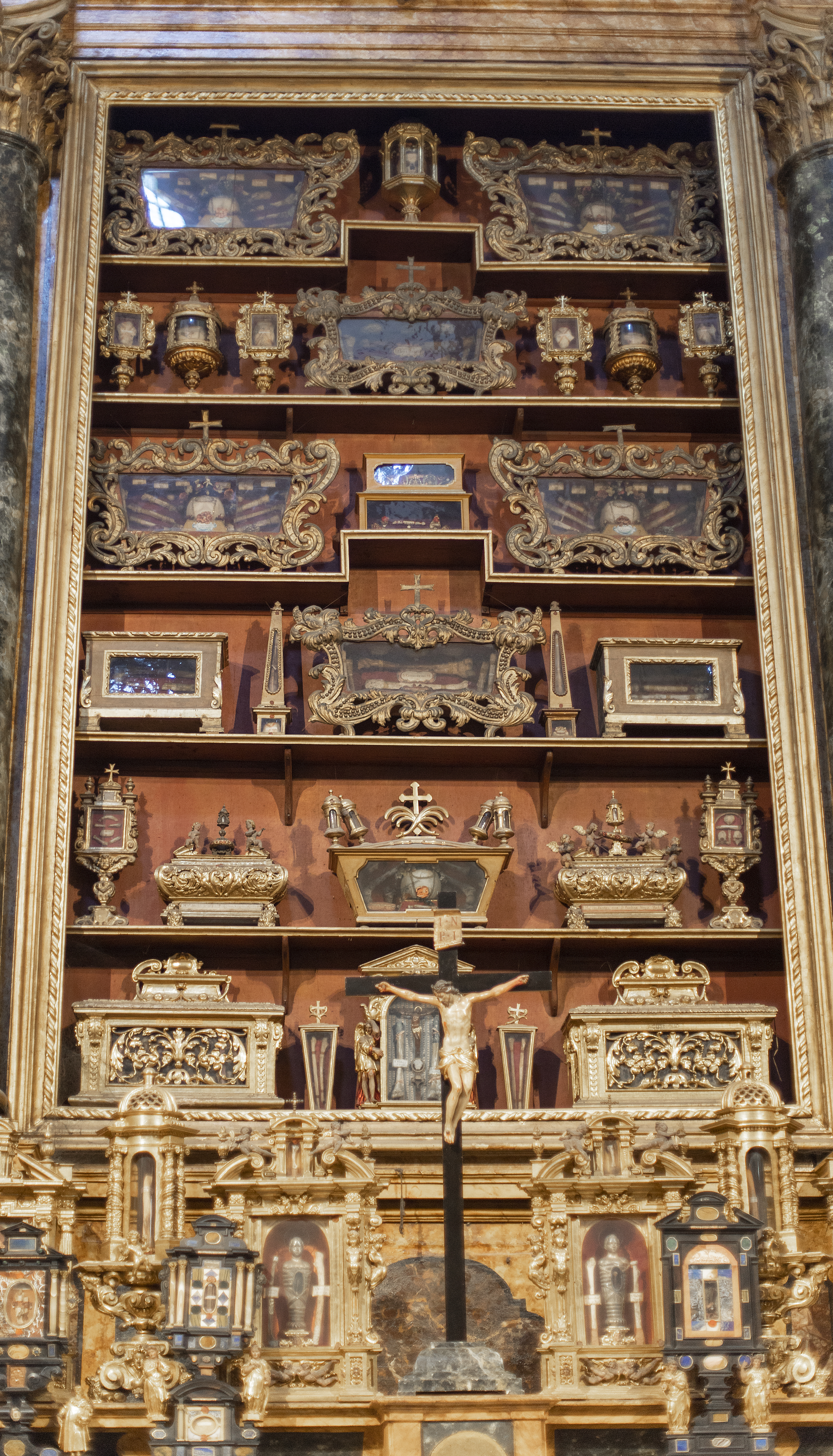
Reliquiari- San Petronio, Bologna

The National Museum of Catalan Art (MNAC) in Barcelona has a digitized display that references another famous 10th century lipsanotheca made of stone called the Lipsanotheca of Santa Maria de Lillet.

The altarpiece is the Cappella delle Reliquie in The Basilica of San Petronio in Bologna is a lipsanotheca containing many reliquaries.

In the basilica of San Lorenzo el Real in the El Escorial are two large altarpieces containing a number of reliquaries. Within the altarpiece depicting the "Annunciation") are relics of female saints; its companion includes the relics of male saints.
