= Augusto Bertazzoni =

Italian romanic-catholic Archbishop

The Most Reverend Augustus Bertazzoni Venerable
- Titular Bishop of Temuniana
- Church: Roman Catholic Church
- Appointed: 30 November 1966
- Term ended: 30 August 1972
- Predecessor: None; see created
- Successor: Thomas Francis Little
- Other post: Bishop of Potenza-Muro Lucano-Marsico Nuovo (1930-1966)

Orders
- Ordination: 23 February 1899
- Consecration: 15 August 1930 by Domenico Menna

Personal details
- Born: Augusto Bertazzoni; 10 January 1876 Polesine di Pegognaga, Mantua, Kingdom of Italy
- Died: 30 August 1972 (aged 96) Potenza, Italy

Sainthood
- Venerated in: Roman Catholic Church
- Title as Saint: Venerable
- Attributes: Episcopal attire

Augusto Bertazzoni (10 January 1876 - 30 August 1972) was an Italian Roman Catholic prelate who served as the Bishop of Potenza from 1930 until his retirement in 1966. He was titled later in his career as an archbishop despite running a normal diocese as opposed to archdiocese; upon his resignation he was given a ceremonial position which he occupied until his death.

The process for his beatification commenced on 8 June 1995 and he was titled as a Servant of God as a result. Pope Francis titled him as Venerable on 2 October 2019.

== Life ==
Augusto Bertazzoni was born in 1876 in Mantua. He was a follower as a child of John Bosco in Turin and was also a close friend of both Luigi Orione and Giovanni Calabria; he was also close to the Bishop of Mantua Giuseppe Melchiorre Sarto, who would become Pope Pius X.

He attended the Oratorio that the Salesians of Don Bosco managed in Turin from 1885 until 1887. Bosco himself proved to be a great influence on Bertazzoni who as bishop would dedicate an altar in the Potenza cathedral to his mentor in 1939. It would be during the course of his studies in Mantua that he first met Bishop Sarto who likewise was an influence on the new seminarian.

Following the completion of his theological studies he was ordained to the priesthood on 25 February 1899 and he later served as the archpriest of the parish of San Benedetto Po from 30 April 1904 until 30 June 1930. In 1922 he was named as a Monsignor. Pope Pius XI later appointed him on 30 June 1930 as the new Bishop of Potenza and Bertazzoni received his episcopal consecration from Domenico Menna on 15 August 1930 on the Feast of the Assumption. He was enthroned in his new episcopal see on 29 October 1930. He led with great wisdom and with fortitude as his pastoral programme included the cultivation of diocesan vocations and commitment to the teaching of catechism.

Following the outbreak of World War II he remained in his diocese to treat all those whom the war hit the hardest and after the air raids of 8 September 1943 did not accept an offer to leave the diocese for another vacant diocese that the Vatican offered him. On 30 November 1950 he was accorded with the honorific title of "Archbishop" in recognition of his services in his diocese from Pope Pius XII.

Bertazzoni attended all five sessions of the Second Ecumenical Council as a Council Father in his role as an archbishop. He retired from his diocese on 30 November 1966 and Pope Paul VI, to compensate for his resignation, appointed him as the first Titular Bishop of Temuniana. This latter role was a ceremonial position and not an actual diocese.

He died after a brief illness on 30 August 1972 and was mourned in his old diocese as a shepherd of God with the reputation of being a saint due to his reputation for personal holiness.

== Beatification process ==
The beatification process commenced in Potenza on 8 June 1995 after the Congregation for the Causes of Saints titled him as a Servant of God and issued the "nihil obstat" (no objections) decree which initiated the formal process. The diocesan process of investigation spanned from 30 October 1995 until 2000 and saw the accumulation of both documentation and witness testimonies. The validation of the process was granted in Rome in 2002 in a decree that the C.C.S. issued.

The Positio that documented Bertazzoni's life of heroic virtue was submitted to the C.C.S. in 2013 for further evaluation. In 2018 the cardinal prefect for the C.C.S., Angelo Amato, sent a letter to the Archbishop of Potenza to mention that the theologians would discuss the cause for Bertazzoni in the first half of 2019. Pope Francis titled Bertazzoni as Venerable on 2 October 2019.

The current postulator for this cause is the Salesian priest Pierluigi Cameroni.
