= Arpi =

Ancient city in Apulia

Coordinates: 41.5530319°N 15.6112769°E

Arpi (Ancient Greek: Ἄρποι), Argyrippa (Ancient Greek: Ἀργύριππα), Argyrippe (Ancient Greek: Ἀργυρίππη), and Argos Hippium (Ancient Greek: Ἄργος Ἵππιον) was an ancient city of Apulia, Italy, 16 miles (26 km) west of the sea coast, and 2 miles (3.5 km) north of modern Foggia (next to the modern Arpi Nova). The first name was Argos Hippium then Argyrippa and later Arpi.

Legend attributes Arpi's foundation to Diomedes, and the figure of a horse, which appears on its coins, shows the importance of horse-breeding in early times in the district. Its territory extended to the sea, and Strabo says that from the extent of the city walls one could gather that it had once been one of the greatest cities of Italy.

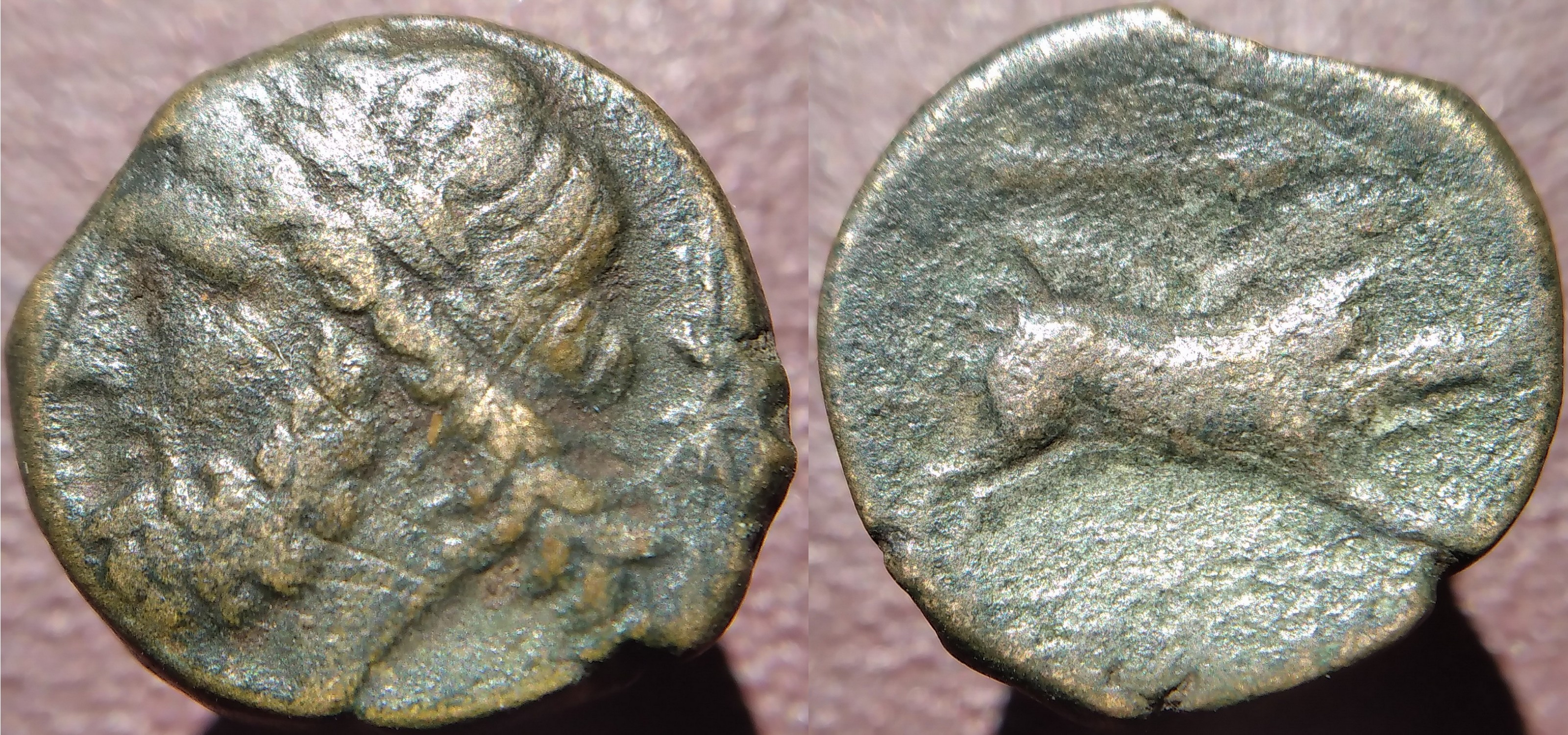
Arpi Apulia monnaie bronze Zeus Sanglier lance

As a protection against the Samnites, Arpi became an ally of Rome. In the war with Pyrrhus, the Arpani aided Rome with a contingent of 4000 foot and 400 horse. Arpi remained faithful to Rome until Rome's defeat at the battle of Cannae, but the consul Quintus Fabius Maximus, son of the famous Roman dictator Quintus Fabius Maximus Verrucosus, captured it in 213 B.C., and it never recovered its former importance. No Roman inscriptions have, indeed, been found here. Foggia is its medieval representative.

Arpi today consists of a huge D-shaped enclosure, which abuts the Torrente Celone, and is visible both on the ground—as a still upstanding rampart—and in aerial photographs. Its extent was rediscovered by the British archaeologist John Bradford. Between 2005 and 2008, it was the subject of extensive surface finds survey by the UCL Institute of Archaeology Tavoliere-Gargano Prehistory Project, which showed its surface to be littered with Iron Age pottery.

== Notes ==
=== References ===
- Smith, William, ed. (1854). "Arpi". Dictionary of Greek and Roman Geography. Vol. I. London: John Murray. pp. 220–221.
