= Cardinal Vicar =

Vicar general for the territory of Rome excluding Vatican City

Vicar General of His Holiness
- Latin: Vicarius Urbis; Italian: Vicario Generale di Sua Santità
- Coat of arms of the Diocese of Rome
- Incumbent; Baldassare Reina since 6 October 2024
- Type: Vicar general
- Reports to: The Bishop of Rome (the Pope)
- Appointer: The Bishop of Rome (the Pope)
- Formation: 13th century
- Unofficial names: Cardinal Vicar/ Cardinal Vicario
- Deputy: Vicegerent
- Website: www.vicariatusurbis.org

Cardinal Vicar (Italian: Cardinale Vicario) is a title commonly given to the vicar general of the Diocese of Rome for the portion of that diocese that lies within Italy (i.e. excluding the portion within Vatican City). The official title, as given in the Annuario Pontificio, is vicar general of His Holiness.

The bishop of Rome is responsible for the spiritual administration of this diocese, but because the bishop of Rome is the pope, with many other responsibilities, he appoints a cardinal vicar with ordinary power to assist in this task. Canon law requires all Catholic dioceses to have one or more vicars general, but the cardinal vicar functions more like a de facto diocesan bishop than do other vicars general. The holder has usually been a cardinal.

A similar position exists to administer the part of the diocese within Vatican City: this role is known as the vicar general for Vatican City or, more exactly, vicar general of His Holiness for Vatican City.

== History ==
=== Establishment ===
It seems certain that in the twelfth century vicars were named only when the pope absented himself for a long time from Rome or its neighbourhood. When he returned, the vicar's duties ceased. This may have lasted until the pontificate of Pope Innocent IV (1243–54). On the other hand it is certain that in the latter half of the thirteenth century the vicar continued to exercise the duties of his office even during the presence of the pope at Rome. Thus the nomination of a vicar on 28 April 1299 is dated from the Lateran. The office owes its full development to the removal of the Roman Curia to Southern France and its final settlement at Avignon. Since then the list of vicars is continuous.

The oldest commissions do not specify any period of duration; in a Bull of 16 June 1307, it is said for the first time that the office is held "at our good will". Life-tenures begin to appear in the sixteenth century; the exact year of this modification remains yet to be fixed. Formerly the nomination was by Bull; when began the custom of nominating by Brief is difficult to determine. The oldest Bull of nomination known bears the date of 13 February 1264.

An immemorial custom of the Curia demands that all its officials shall be duly sworn in, and this was the case with the vicars. In all probability during the twelfth and thirteenth centuries such oaths were taken at the hands of the pope himself. Later the duty fell to the Apostolic Camera. The oath is conceived in very general terms and lays but slight stress on the special duties of the vicar. The official named on 18 October 1412, as representative of the vicar was also sworn in, and before entering on his office was admonished to take, in presence of a specified cardinal, the usual oath of fidelity to the pope and of a faithful exercise of the office.

=== Authority ===
According to the oldest known decree of nomination, 13 February 1264, both Romans and foreigners were subject to the jurisdiction of the vicar. In this document, however, neither the special rights of the vicar nor the local extent of his authority are made known, but it is understood that the territory in question is the city of Rome. On 27 June 1288, the vicar received the rights of "visitation, correction and reformation in spiritual matters ..... of dedicating churches and reconciling cemeteries, consecrating altars, blessing, confirming, and ordaining suitable persons from the city". On 21 July 1296, On 6 July 1202, the following variant is met with: "to reform the churches, clergy, and people of Rome itself", and the additional right to do other things pertaining to the office of vicar.

His jurisdiction over all monasteries is first vouched for 16 June 1207. The inclusion among these of monasteries, exempt and non-exempt and their inmates, without the walls of Rome, was the first step in the local extension of the vicar's jurisdiction. He was also empowered to confer vacant benefices in the city.

Special commissions, however, multiply in this period, bearing with them in each case a special extension or new application of authority. Under Pope Clement VI (1342–52) the territory of the vicar-general's jurisdiction was notably increased by the inclusion of the suburbs and the rural district about Rome. Until the time of Pope Benedict XIV (1740–58) this was the extent of the vicar's jurisdiction. By the "district of the city of Rome" was understood a distance of forty Italian miles from the city walls. Since, however, the territory of the suburbicarian sees lay partially within these limits, the vicar came to exercise a jurisdiction concurrent with that of the local bishop and cumulatively. This was a source of frequent conflicts, until 21 December 1744, when the local jurisdiction of the suburbicarian bishops was abolished by Benedict XIV, insofar as their territory fell within the above-mentioned limits.

In the course of time the vicar acquired not only the position and authority of a vicar-general, who has ordinary but delegated power, but the right of subdelegation, whereby he named a vicegerent, his representative not only in pontifical ceremonies (as many maintain), but also in jurisdiction.

By a Constitution of Clement VIII, 8 June 1592, the vicar's right to hold a visitation ordinary and extraordinary of churches, monasteries, clergy, and the people (dating from 16 June 1307) was withdrawn in favour of the Congregatio Visitationis Apostolicæ, newly founded, for the current affairs of the ordinary visitation. Henceforth this duty pertains to the vicarius urbis only insofar as he may be named president or member of this congregation, the prefect of which is the pope himself. The great "extraordinary" visitations, held generally at the beginning of each pontificate, were executed by a specially-appointed commission of cardinals and prelates, the presidency of which fell by custom to the vicar. The Congregation of the Visitation was quite independent of the vicar, being constituted by Apostolic authority.

The authority of the vicar does not cease with the pope who appointed him. But should he die during a vacancy of the Holy See, the vicegerent assumed his functions as a quasi vicar capitular.

=== Pope Pius X: Etsi Nos (1912) ===
In 1908, Pope Pius X re-organized the Roman Curia with the Apostolic Constitution Sapienti Consilio. The essential ordinances of the Constitution and the enacting ordinances afterwards issued for the congregations and curial authorities in regard to the manner in which business should be transacted also apply to the vicariate.

Four years later he turned his attention to the Urban Vicariate, whose administrative practice had become cumbersome, time-consuming, and inefficient. Various difficulties had stood in the way of a thorough reform of the Roman vicariate. Not the least of these was the lack of space in the former office of the vicariate. It was not until after the purchase of the Palazzo Mariscotti near Santissime Stimmate di San Francesco, which was assigned to the cardinal vicar and his officials and arranged for their use, that Pius X was able to carry out his long cherished plan for a thorough reform of the Roman vicariate.

Pius published his new ordinances respecting the administration of his Diocese of Rome in the Apostolic Constitution Etsi nos of 1 January 1912. The canon law entered into force, as provided in it, on 15 January 1912, the day it was promulgated in the Acta Apostolicae Sedis.

The Curia Urbis or the Vicariate of the City of Rome was divided into four departments (officia):

- divine worship and apostolic visitation, including the treasury of relics (lipsanotheca), the archaeological commission, the committee on church music, and a commission on ecclesiastical art
- discipline of the clergy and the Christian people, overseeing the clergy, women's religious institutions, schools, colleges and other institutions for education in the city, brotherhoods, unions, and social societies.
- judicial matters
- financial administration and other administrative affairs

The cardinal who serves as the pope’s vicar general in Rome heads all these bureaus. His office and powers are permanent and continue even when the papal see is vacant. This distinguishes the cardinal vicar as he is commonly called, though the designation is not an official title from all other vicars general and gives him a unique legal position. The four departments may also continue their ordinary work when the vicar cannot supervise them because of a conclave or another impediment. Even if the vicar dies, their work proceeds without interruption.

=== Pope Benedict XV ===
Pope Benedict XV, in his apostolic letter In Ordinandis of 20 April 1917, modified some of the provisions of his predecessor. In 1929, with the establishment of Vatican City, Pope Pius XII removed Vatican City State from the authority of the cardinal vicar.

=== Pope John XXIII ===
Pope John XXIII established that the offices of the vicarate would be located at the Lateran Palace. He paid tribute to the work of his Cardinal Vicar, Clemente Micara, in his speech announcing the proposed Second Vatican Council.

=== Pope Paul VI: Romanae Urbis (1966) ===
In the 1966 moto proprio Romanae Urbis the diocese was divided into five sections. Auxiliary Bishops were appointed to supervise pastoral ministry in a territorial sector or possibly in a specific pastoral activity in the entire diocesan area.

Pope Paul VI further updated the norms relating to the functioning of the Vicariate in the Apostolic Constitution Vicariae potestatis in urbe, superseding Etsi Nos.

=== Pope John Paul II: Ecclesia in Urbe (1998) ===
Starting from the Apostolic Constitution Vicariae potestatis in urbe, published by Paul VI on January 6, 1977, John Paul II explains in the introductory paragraphs the importance of the Vicariate of Rome. The Diocesan Council for Economic Affairs, assumed functions previously handled by Pius X's fourth department. It had the task of preparing the budget for the economic management of the Diocese every year and of approving the final statement of income and expenditure.

The Diocesan Curia of Rome was divided into pastoral and administrative offices and judicial bodies. Twenty distinct offices were established for pastoral care, including the Office for school pastoral care and religious education, the Liturgical office, the Clergy office, and others. Eight administrative office were created, such as, the General Archive, the Legal office, the Data Processing Center, and others. The judicial bodies are: the Ordinary Tribunal of the Diocese of Rome, the Court of First Instance for cases of nullity of marriage in the Lazio Region, and the Court of Appeal. These tribunals operate according to norms established by the Italian Bishops Conference.

The Opera Romana Pellegrinaggi, set up to serve pilgrims, operates in the Vicariate of Rome under its own rules and procedures.

== Vicegerents ==
The first episcopal assistant of the vicar known is Angelus de Tineosis, Episcopus Viterbiensis, named 2 October 1321, as assistant to the Vicar Andreas, Episcopus Terracinensis. No clear outline of his duties survives, but he is known to have officiated as assistant even when the Vicar Andreas was in the city. On the other hand, the Vicar Franciscus Scaccani, Episcopus Nolanus, was allowed to choose an assistant for the business of the vicariate only in the case of his own absence from Rome. According to this document it was not for the pope but the vicar himself, though authorized thereto by the pope, who chose his own assistant and gave over to him all his authority or faculties, insofar as they were based on law or custom. This shows that the vicarius urbis was firmly established in the fulness of his office and externally recognized as such; certain consuetudinary rights had even at this date grown up and become accepted. The Bullarium Magnum (II, 75) indicates that on 18 October 1412, Pope John XXII nominated Petrus Saccus, a canon of St. Peter's, as locum tenens of the Vicar Franciscus, abbas monasterii S. Martini in Monte Cimino O.S.B., and himself conferred on this official all the faculties of the vicar. The new locum tenens was bidden to take the usual oath before the Apostolic Camera (see above). A similar case is that of Andreas Jacobazzi, a canon of St. Peter's, named vicar in 1519, but not consecrated as Bishop of Lucera until 1520; the pontificalia were committed to Vincentius, Bishop of Ottochaz-Zengg.

The series of assistants to the vicar, now known as vices-gerentes (vicegerents), begins with 1560. Until the time of Pope Clement XI (1700) they were named by the vicar; since then the pope has appointed them by a special Brief. The vicesgerens is therefore not a representative (locum tenens) of the vicar, but a subordinate auxiliary bishop appointed for life, though removable at any time. His authority (faculties) relative to jurisdiction and orders is identical with that of the vicar; for its exercise, however, he depends on the latter, as is expressly stated in the Brief of his nomination. In particular, the vicar has committed to him the administration of the treasury of relics known as the Lisanotheca or relic-treasury of the vicariate, the censorship of books, and the permission to print. The censorship of books was entrusted to the vicar by a Bull of 4 May 1515 (in the Magnum Bullarium); this right, however, is now exercised by the vices-gerens subject to the Magister sacri palatii, to whose imprimatur he adds his own name without further examination of the book in question. The really responsible censor is therefore the Magister sacri palati, not the vicesgerens. Occasionally there have been two assistants of the vicar, to one of whom were committed all matters of jurisdiction, to the other the pontificalia and ordinations; the latter was known as suffragan of the vicar.

== Organisation of the Vicariate of Rome ==
=== Ordinations ===
In this respect the duties of the vicar are of primary importance, since a multitude of ecclesiastics from all parts of the world pursue their studies at Rome and receive orders there on presentation of the required authorization of their respective bishops. For every order conferred at Rome there is a special examination conducted by a body of twenty-five learned ecclesiastics from the secular and the regular clergy, which operates in sections of three. Orders are regularly conferred on the days prescribed by ecclesiastical law and in the cathedral of the Bishop of Rome, i. e. in the Lateran Basilica; they may, however, be conferred on other days and in other churches or chapels. They are usually conferred either by the vicar himself or by the vicesgerens; by special delegation from the vicar, however, another bishop may occasionally ordain candidates. By a general pontifical indult any bishop resident in Rome may administer the Sacrament of Confirmation, it being still customary at Rome to confirm all children who seem in danger of death.

=== Religious orders ===
All matters concerning the monasteries of Rome and their inmates pertain to a special commission in the vicariate composed of about eight members and under the direction of the vicar.

=== Preaching ===
Strict regulations of Pope Pius X permit only those to preach in Rome who have been found worthy after a thorough examination, scientific and practical, before a special commission which issues to each successful candidate the proper authorization. A similar regulation exists for priests desirous of hearing confessions in the city.

=== Parochial clergy ===
The parochial clergy of Rome form a special corporation, under a Camerlengo chosen annually by themselves. Apart from the rights secured them by their statutes, insofar as approved by the pope, they are entirely subject to the vicar.

=== Court ===
Since the vicar is the ordinary judge of the Roman Curia and its territory, it follows that he has always had and now has his own court, or tribunal. Formerly it took cognizance of both civil and criminal matters, either alone or concurrently with other tribunals, whether the case pertained to voluntary or to contentious jurisdiction. This court no longer deals with criminal cases, though it still exists for certain matters provided for in the ecclesiastical law, the details of which may be seen in any of the larger manuals of canon law. The principal officials of the court of the vicariate are the above-mentioned vicegerents, the locum tenens civilia, the promotor fiscalis for cases of beatification and canonization, the promotor fiscalis for other ecclesiastical matters, chiefly monastic vows. In former times the auditor of the vicariate was a very busy person, being called on to formulate or to decide the various processes brought before the vicar; today the office is mostly an honorary one. Matrimonial cases are dealt with by two officials who form a special section of the vicariate

=== Secretariate ===
Among the minor officials of the vicar the most important are those who have charge of the secretariate, i. e. the secretary, his representative, two minutanti or clerks, and the aforesaid auditor of the vicar. The secretary is daily at his post and is authorized by subdelegation to decide or settle a number of minor matters of a regularly recurring nature; he also makes known the decisions of the vicar in more important matters; and is accessible to every one daily during a period of two hours.

== Reorganization ==
On 6 January 2023, Pope Francis reorganized the Vicariate with the apostolic constitution In Ecclesiarum Communione, effective 31 January, to increase collegiality and improve administration and address contemporary societal challenges. It defined the position of cardinal vicar as an auxiliary bishop to the Bishop of Rome and clarified the roles of Rome's auxiliary bishops. Francis gave himself a greater role as head of the episcopal council, that is, the collective body of the bishops of the Diocese. This replaced the 1998 apostolic constitution Ecclesia in Urbe.

== List of Vicars General ==
The first vicarius in spiritualibus clearly vouched for is Bovo (Bobo) episcopus Tusculanus (Lavicanus) about 1106. Until 1260 the vicars were chosen from among the cardinals; the first vicar taken from among the bishops in the vicinity of Rome was the Dominican Thomas Fusconi de Berta, episcopus Senensis (Moroni, Eubel). This custom continued until the secret consistory of 29 November 1558, when Pope Paul IV decreed that in the future the vicars should be chosen from among the cardinals of episcopal dignity; it was then that arose the popular title of "cardinal-vicar", never used officially; the formal title was then Vicarius Urbis, and is now, under the Annuario Heading heading "Vicariato di Roma – Vicariatus Urbis", "Vicario Generale di Sua Santità".

=== Cardinal Vicars General (1198–1260) ===
1. Ottaviano dei Conti (1198–1207)
2. Pietro Gallocia (1207–1217)
3. Pietro Saxonis (1217–1227)
4. Romano Bonaventura (1227–1238)
5. Giacomo da Pecoraia (1238–1244)
6. Stefano Normandi (1244–1251)
7. Riccardo Annibaldi (1251–1260)

=== Bishop Vicar General (1260–1558) ===
1. Tommaso Fusconi di Berta (1260–1262)
2. Giovanni Colonna (1262–1264)
3. Tommaso da Lentini (1264–1267)
4. N.N. (1267–1272)
5. Aldobrandino Cavalcanti (1272–1280)
6. Latino Frangipani Malabranca (1280–1288)
7. Bartolomeo di Grosseto (1288–1290)
8. Giovanni di Iesi, first time (1290–1291)
9. Salvo di Recanati (1291–1295)
10. Giovanni di Iesi, second time (1295–1296)
11. Lamberto di Veglia (1296–1299)
12. Alemanno di Tiro e Oristano (1299–1301)
13. Ranuccio di Cagliari (1301–1302)
14. Nicola Alberti (1302–1303)
15. Giovanni di Osimo (1303–1303)
16. Giacomo di Sutri (1303–1307)
17. Guittone Farnese (1307–1309)
18. Isnardo Tacconi (1309–1313)
19. Ruggero da Casole (1313–1317)
20. Giovanni di Nepi (1317–1322)
21. Andrea di Terracina, first time (1322–1324)
22. Angelo Tignosi, first time (1324–1325)
23. Andrea di Terracina, second time (1325–1325)
24. Angelo Tignosi, second time (1325–1335)
25. Giovanni Pagnotta (1335–1341)
26. Nicola Zucci (1341–1343)
27. Raimondo di Rieti (1343–1348)
28. Ponzio di Orvieto (1348–1361)
29. Giovanni di Orvieto (1361–1365)
30. Pietro Boerio (1365–1369)
31. Giacomo di Muti (1369–1375)
32. Luca Gentili Ridolfucci (1375–1380)
33. Stefano Palosi (1380–1383)
34. Gabriele Gabrieli (1383–1389)
35. Lorenzo Corvini (1389–1392)
36. Giovanni di San Paolo fuori le Mura (1392–1394)
37. Francesco Scaccani (1394–1405)
38. Paolo di Francesco di Roma (1405–1411)
39. Francesco di San Martino di Viterbo (1411–1414)
40. Pietro Sacco (1414–1417)
41. Giacomo Isolani (1417–1421)
42. Sante di Tivoli (1421–1427)
43. Nicola Lazzaro di Guinigi (1427–1429)
44. Luca de Ilpinis (1429-16/04/1431)
45. Daniele Gari Scotti (1431–1431)
46. Gasparre di Diano (1431–1434)
47. Stefano di Volterra (1434–1435)
48. Genesio di Cagli (1435–1437)
49. Andrea di Osimo (1437–1444)
50. Giosuè Mormile (1441–1444)
51. Onofrio Francesco di Melfi (1444–1448)
52. Roberto Cavalcanti (1448–1449)
53. Berardo Eruli (1449–1458)
54. Francesco de Lignamine (1458–1461)
55. Giovanni Neroni (1461–1464)
56. Dominico Dominici (1464–1479)
57. Nicola Trevisano (1479–1485)
58. Leonardo di Albenga (1485–1486)
59. Giacomo Botta (1486–1494)
60. Giacomo Serra (1494–1501)
61. Pietro Gamboa (1501–1505)
62. Pietro Accolti (1505–1511)
63. Domenico Jacobazzi (1511–1520)
64. Andrea Jacobazzi (1520–1521)
65. Paolo Capizucchi (1521–1539)
66. Bartolomeo Guidiccioni (1539–1540)
67. Pomponio Cecci (1540–1542)
68. Filippo Archinto (1542–1554)
69. Ludovico Beccadelli (1554–1555)
70. Pietro di Lucera (1555–1555)
71. Virgilio Rosario (1555–1558)

=== Cardinal Vicars General (1558–present) ===
1. Virgilio Rosario (1558–1559)
2. Giacomo Savelli (1560–1587)
3. Girolamo Rusticucci (1588–1603)
4. Camillo Borghese (1603–1605), elected as Pope Paul V
5. Girolamo Pamphili (1605–1610)
6. Giovanni Garzia Millini (1610–1629)
7. Marzio Ginetti (1629–1671)
8. Paluzzo Paluzzi Altieri degli Albertoni (1671)
9. Gasparo Carpegna (1671–1714)
10. Niccolò Caracciolo (pro-vicar, 1715–1717)
11. Giandomenico Paracciani (1717–1721)
12. Fabrizio Paolucci (1721–1726)
13. Prospero Marefoschi (1726–1732)
14. Giovanni Guadagni, OCD (1732–1759)
15. Antonio Maria Erba-Odescalchi (1759–1762)
16. Marcantonio Colonna (iuniore, 1762–1793)
17. Andrea Corsini (not to be confused with St. Andrea Corsini) (1793–1795)
18. Giulio Maria della Somaglia (1795–1818)
19. Lorenzo Litta (1818–1820)
20. Annibale della Genga (1820–1823), elected as Pope Leo XII
21. Carlo Odescalchi (1834–1838)
22. Giuseppe della Porta Rodiani (1838–1841)
23. Costantino Patrizi Naro (1841–1876)
24. Raffaele Monaco La Valletta (1876–1880)
25. Lucido Parocchi (1884–1899)
26. Domenico Jacobini (1899–1900)
27. Pietro Respighi (1900–1913)
28. Basilio Pompili (1913–1931)
29. Francesco Marchetti-Selvaggiani (1931–1951)
30. Clemente Micara (1951–1965)
31. Luigi Traglia (1965–1968)
32. Angelo Dell'Acqua (1968–1972)
33. Ugo Poletti (1973–1991)
34. Camillo Ruini (1991–2008) (Note: Pope John Paul II named Ruini pro-vicar general in January 1991 and only changed his title to vicar general after he was made a cardinal in June.)
35. Agostino Vallini (2008–2017)
36. Angelo De Donatis (2017–2024) (Note: De Donatis was not made a cardinal until 28 June 2018, 13 months after being named Vicar General. The fact that De Donatis was not a cardinal when appointed Vicar General was a departure from centuries of tradition. A source close to Pope Francis said: "Just as the pope made an auxiliary bishop a cardinal while remaining an auxiliary, that suits his desire to distinguish the bishop's pastoral role on the one hand from a cardinal's responsibility for service to the universal church." (original in French) Other reports predicted De Donatis would be made a cardinal: "A decree instituted by Pope Paul IV in 1558 also holds that the Vicar of Rome must be a cardinal. Since Pope Francis has already named him as an archbishop, it's likely Donatis could be added to the list of 5 prelates who will get a red hat during the June 28 consistory.")
37. Baldassare Reina (6 October 2024 – present)

== Sources ==
- A then complete but uncritical list of the vicarii in spiritualibus in urbe generales was published by Ponzetti (Rome, 1797); it was added to and improved by Moroni (Dizionario, XCIX).
- From the manuscripts of Francesco Cancellieri in the Vatican Library new names were added by Crostarosa (Dei titoli della Chiesa romana, Rome, 1893). Eubel, by his own studies for the first volume of his "Hierarchia Catholica Medii Ævi", and with the aid of the manuscript notes of Giuseppe Garampi in the Vatican Archives, was enabled to present a new list substantially enlarged and improved (1200–1552). Many new discoveries of the undersigned have enabled him to draw up a critical list of the vicars and their representatives from 1100 to 1600. For the period before 1100 a fresh examination of all the original sources is necessary; for the present all names previous to that date must be held as uncertain.

== See also ==
- Suburbicarian Diocese of Ostia
- Vicar General for Vatican City
