= Angelo De Donatis =

Italian Catholic prelate (born 1954)

His Eminence Angelo De Donatis
- Major Penitentiary of the Apostolic Penitentiary
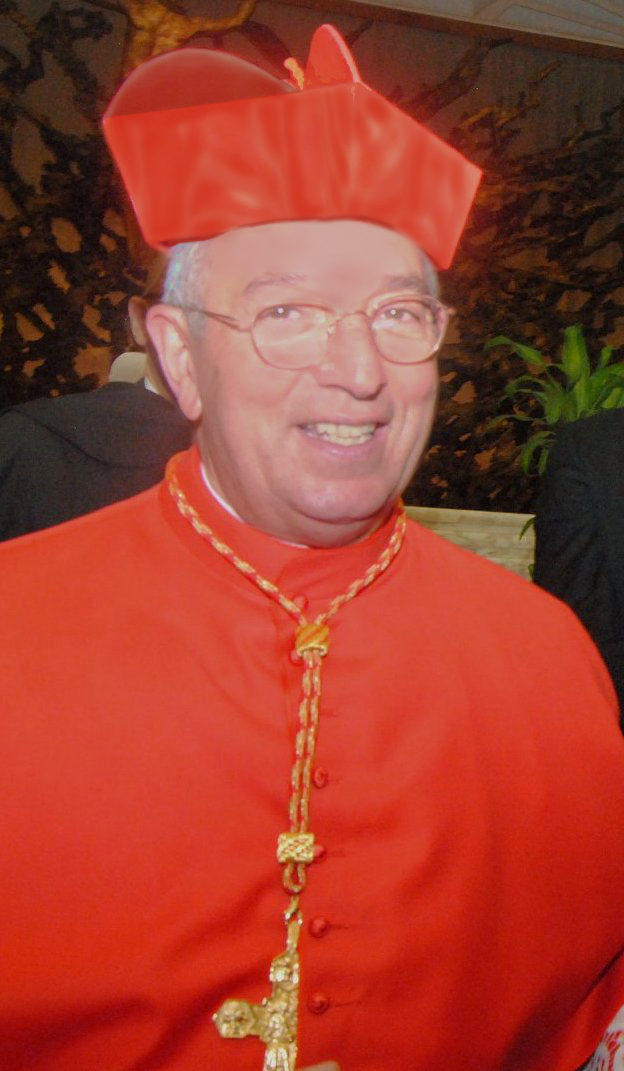
- Cardinal De Donatis in 2018
- Church: Catholic Church; Latin Church
- Appointed: 6 April 2024
- Predecessor: Mauro Piacenza (Major Penitentiary) and Agostino Vallini (Vicar of Rome )
- Successor: Baldassare Reina (Vicar of Rome)
- Other post: Cardinal Protector of San Marco (2018‍–‍)
- Previous posts: Auxiliary Bishop of Rome (2015‍–‍2017); Titular Bishop of Mottola (2015‍–‍2017); Titular Archbishop of Mottola (2017‍–‍2018); Apostolic Administrator of the Ukrainian Catholic Apostolic Exarchate of Italy (2019‍–‍2020); Vicar General of His Holiness (2017‍–‍2024); Archpriest of St. John Lateran Basilica (2017‍–‍2024); Apostolic Administrator of Ostia (2017‍–‍2024); Grand Chancellor of the Pontifical Lateran University (2017‍–‍2024)

Orders
- Ordination: 12 April 1980 by Antonio Rosario Mennonna
- Consecration: 9 November 2015 by Pope Francis
- Created cardinal: 28 June 2018 by Pope Francis
- Rank: Cardinal-Priest

Personal details
- Born: Angelo De Donatis; 4 January 1954 (age 72) Casarano, Lecce, Apulia, Italy
- Motto: Nihil caritate dulcius (Latin for 'Nothing is sweeter than love')
- Coat of arms

Ordination history of Angelo De Donatis
History
Priestly ordination
- Ordained by: Antonio Rosario Mennonna
- Date: 12 April 1980
- Place: Church of San Domenico, Casarano
Episcopal consecration
- Principal consecrator: Pope Francis
- Co-consecrators: Agostino Vallini, Beniamino Stella
- Date: 9 November 2015
- Place: Archbasilica of St. John Lateran, Rome
Cardinalate
- Elevated by: Pope Francis
- Date: 28 June 2018
Episcopal succession
Bishops consecrated by Angelo De Donatis as principal consecrator
- Giacomo Morandi: 30 September 2017
- Paolo Riccardi: 13 January 2018
- Daniele Libanori: 13 January 2018
- Gianpiero Palmieri: 24 June 2018
- Dario Gervasi: 18 October 2020
- Enrico Feroci: 15 November 2020
- Benoni Ambăruş: 2 May 2021

Angelo De Donatis (born 4 January 1954) is an Italian Catholic prelate who has served as Major Penitentiary since 2024. He was Cardinal Vicar (officially Vicar General of His Holiness) and Archpriest of the Archbasilica of St. John Lateran from 2017 to 2024.

Prior to his appointment as Cardinal Vicar, De Donatis was an auxiliary bishop of the Diocese of Rome since 2015.

== Biography ==
Angelo De Donatis was born on 4 January 1954 in Casarano, a comune in the Province of Lecce and the Italian region of Apulia. He attended the seminary of Taranto and the Pontifical Roman Major Seminary. While in Rome, he studied philosophy at the Pontifical Lateran University and theology at the Pontifical Gregorian University, where he earned a Licentiate of Sacred Theology in moral theology.

=== Priestly ministry ===
On 12 April 1980, De Donatis was ordained a priest in the Church of San Domenico in Casarano in the Diocese of Nardò-Gallipoli by Bishop Antonio Rosario Mennonna. He then taught religion at the Church of San Saturnino in Rome, of which he later became vicar. He was incardinated in the Diocese of Rome on 28 November 1983.

From 1989 to 1991, De Donatis was the archivist of the Secretary of the College of Cardinals. He became the spiritual director of the Pontifical Roman Major Seminary, where he served until 2003, when he was appointed a parish priest at the Basilica of San Marco Evangelista al Campidoglio in Rome and an assistant for the National Association of Relatives of Clergy. He also served as the director of the clergy of the Vicariate of Rome from 1990 to 1996. He then became a member of the pastoral council and the college of consultors of the Diocese of Rome.

De Donatis was admitted as a knight to the Equestrian Order of the Holy Sepulchre of Jerusalem in 1989. On 10 April 1990, he was appointed a Chaplain of His Holiness, receiving the title of monsignor.

In 2017 he was a spiritual assistant to the Don Andrea Santoro Association, which marks the anniversary of the assassination in Turkey in 2006 of Andrea Santoro, an Italian priest and seminary classmate of De Donatis. De Donatis has maintained a connection with his hometown by leading spiritual exercises annually during the summer at the Crypt of the Crucifix in Casarano.

He was among seven Roman priests chosen by Archbishop Giovanni Angelo Becciu to eat lunch with Pope Francis after the Chrism Mass in 2013, just two weeks after the Pope's election. In October 2013, Pope Francis, who had met De Donatis only once at that lunch, chose him to preach the 2014 Lenten spiritual exercises of the Roman Curia, an assignment that for fifty years had been given to a cardinal or well-known theologian.

=== Episcopal ministry ===
Styles of Angelo De Donatis
- Reference style: His Eminence
- Spoken style: Your Eminence
- Religious style: Cardinal
- Informal style: Cardinal

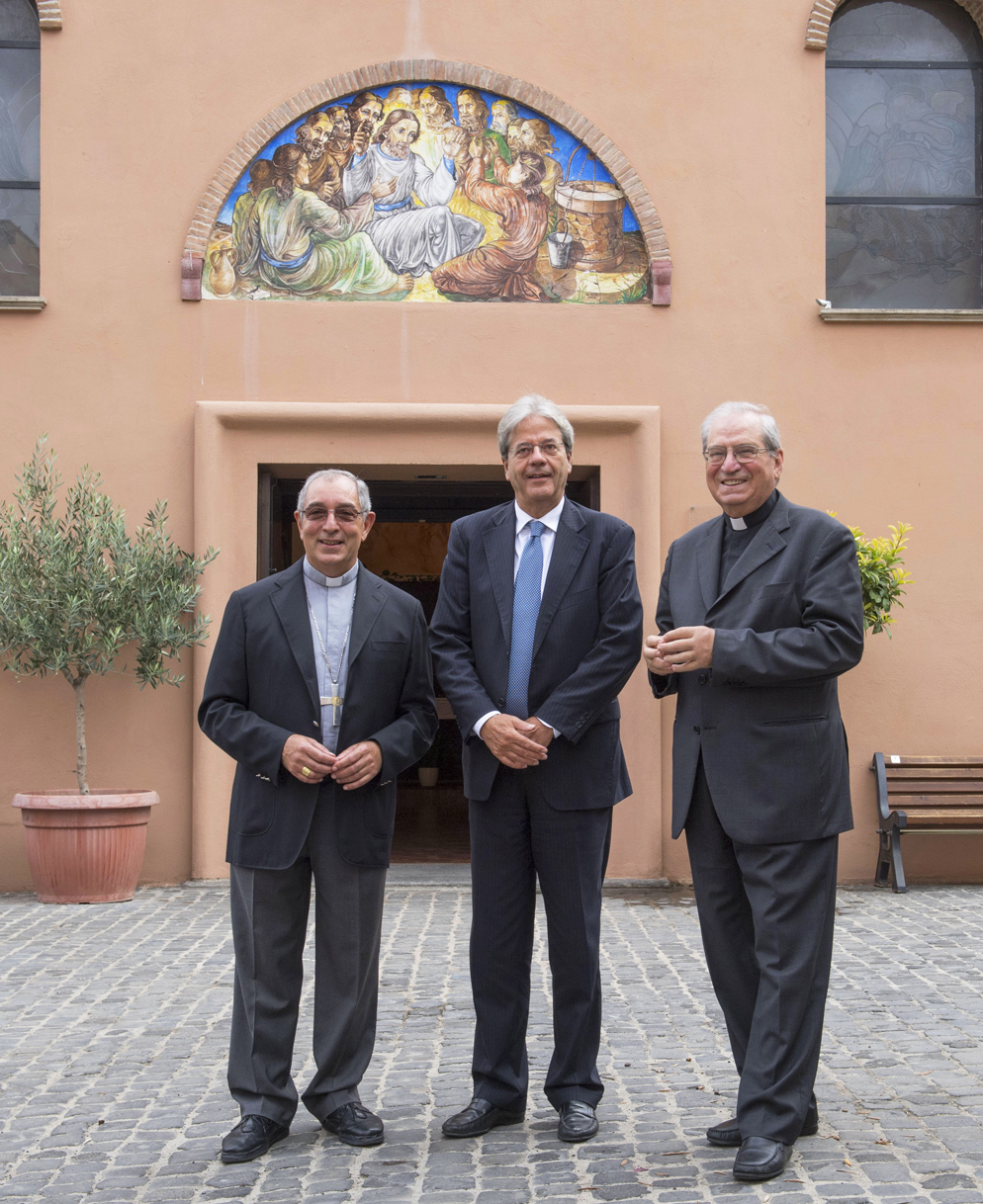
De Donatis (left) with Prime Minister Paolo Gentiloni (center) and Msgr. Enrico Feroci (right) at Caritas Roma in 2017

De Donatis was appointed by Pope Francis on 14 September 2015 the Titular Bishop of Mottola and an Auxiliary Bishop of Rome, where he was responsible for the training of the clergy. He was consecrated a bishop in the Archbasilica of St. John Lateran on 9 November 2015. Pope Francis was the principal consecrator, while Cardinal Agostino Vallini, the Vicar General of Rome, and Cardinal Beniamino Stella, the Prefect of the Congregation for the Clergy, acted as co-consecrators. De Donatis adopted his coat of arms with the episcopal motto "nihil caritate dulcius", a phrase taken from Saint Ambrose, which translates from the Latin as "nothing is sweeter than charity".

On 29 April 2016, De Donatis was appointed the rector of the Church of San Sebastiano al Palatino in Rome. On 6 June of that year, he oversaw the jubilee of priests during the Extraordinary Jubilee of 2016 in the Diocese of Rome and was involved in the organization of the jubilee activities in the Diocese of Trapani. He also led the Confessio Vitae during the jubilee year in the Archdiocese of Milan.

In September 2016, De Donatis published Nulla è più dolce dell'amore (Nothing is Sweeter than Love), a collection of twenty reflections on the various forms of mercy as interpreted through the Bible.

On 26 May 2017, Pope Francis appointed De Donatis the Vicar General of Rome and Archpriest of the Archbasilica of St. John Lateran, elevating him as well to the rank of archbishop. The Vicar General serves as de facto bishop of Rome on behalf of the pope. Pope Francis ignored the rule that the vicar general of Rome must be a cardinal. (Note: When Pope John Paul II named Camillo Ruini his vicar general on 17 January 1991, he gave him the title "pro-vicar general", the formula used when an appointee could anticipate receiving the proper title eventually. Ruini became a cardinal on 28 June of that year and was named vicar general on 1 July.) De Donatis is the first person since the sixteenth century to be named Vicar General when not a cardinal. (Note: In 1558 Pope Paul IV decreed that the Vicar General of Rome is always a cardinal or is made a cardinal soon after being appointed. De Donatis was not created a cardinal at the consistory that followed the announcement of his appointment as Vicar by a month, and Vatican observers disagreed as to whether he would be made a cardinal at the next consistory. A source close to Pope Francis said: "Tout comme le pape a créé cardinal un évêque auxiliaire qui continuera à l'être, cela correspond bien à la volonté de François de bien séparer, d'un côté, le rôle pastoral de l'évêque et, de l'autre, la charge cardinalice au service de l'Église universelle." ["Just as the pope made an auxiliary bishop a cardinal while remaining an auxiliary, that suits his desire to distinguish the bishop's pastoral role on the one hand from a cardinal's responsibility for service to the universal church."] Other reports predicted De Donatis would be made a cardinal: "A decree instituted by Pope Paul IV in 1558 also holds that the Vicar of Rome must be a cardinal. Since Pope Francis has already named him as an archbishop, it's likely Donatis could be added to the list of 5 prelates who will get a red hat during the June 28 consistory.") As Vicar General he serves ex officio as Grand Chancellor of the Pontifical Lateran University. At the same time, he was made the apostolic administrator of the Suburbicarian Diocese of Ostia.

=== Cardinalate ===
On 20 May 2018, Pope Francis announced he would make De Donatis a cardinal at the next consistory. At the consistory on 28 June 2018, he was created Cardinal-Priest of San Marco, the same church where he served as a parish priest fifteen years earlier.

De Donatis was the apostolic administrator of the Ukrainian Catholic Apostolic Exarchate of Italy from 11 July 2019 to 24 October 2020.

On 12 March 2020, when public Masses were already prohibited in Italy, De Donatis ordered Rome's churches closed to the public. Cardinal Konrad Krajewski and others opened churches anyway. On 13 March he ordered that parish churches could open provided they took appropriate measures to prevent the spread of the COVID-19 virus. He said he spoke with Pope Francis before issuing each of those orders. In a letter to the diocese he wrote: "The risk of health care structures collapsing is evident.... We can contain this tragic eventuality only by applying measures to stop the contagion and allow the national health service to reorganize.... Draw close to one another — not physically, but with solidarity.... Unfortunately, going to church is no different than going anywhere: There is a risk of contagion."

After testing positive for COVID-19, De Donatis entered the Agostino Gemelli University Policlinic with a fever on 30 March 2020; he had not been in physical contact with Pope Francis or visited the Vatican recently. He was released on 10 April and continued to recuperate at home.

Cardinal De Donatis was criticised by victims of Marko Rupnik's alleged spiritual and sexual abuse who expressed "bewilderment" with the Diocese of Rome's statement praising the art and theology centre he founded.

He has also been criticised by traditionalists for his implementation of Traditionis custodes after he issued new regulations, that permitted the celebration of the Mass in the extraordinary form, except during the Triduum, and issuing a total ban on celebration of the other sacraments in the extraordinary form.

In January 2023, Pope Francis reorganized the Diocese of Rome, greatly restricted the role of vicar general. He defined the role of each auxiliary bishop and took direct charge of many diocesan decisions. He defined the vicar general's role as a coordinator of the work of diocesan bodies, defined him as an auxiliary, and restricted his sphere of responsibility with the rule that the vicar general "will not undertake important initiatives or ones exceeding ordinary administration without first reporting to me".

On 6 April 2024, Pope Francis appointed him Major Penitentiary. The pope told his auxiliaries that he would "take time to carry out a healthy discernment" before naming a new vicar general.

He participated as a cardinal elector in the 2025 papal conclave that elected Pope Leo XIV.

== Coat of arms ==
Angelo De Donatis' coat of arms

=== Blazon ===
Tierced inverted pall: in the first, red division of the field is contained a winged lion with a halo, with the head front-facing, while crouching and holding with its front legs in front of its chest a golden book bearing in black, capital letters PAX TIBI MARCE in four rows on the first side, and EVANGELISTA MEUS in four rows on the second side. In the second blue division on the right-hand side is a charge of a silver umbraculum. In the third, silver division is a branch with an open pomegranate. A gothic patriarchal cross is behind the shield and a galero, signifying De Donatis' archiepiscopal status.

Before being appointed the Vicar General of Rome, De Donatis' coat of arms as auxiliary bishop was divided into red and silver fields, without the umbraculum on the blue field.

=== Episcopal motto ===
The words of De Donatis' Latin episcopal motto, nihil caritate dulcius ("nothing is sweeter than love" in English), are taken from St. Ambrose's De officiis ministrorum (in English: On the Duties of the Clergy): "Be among you the peace that surpasses all feeling. Love one another. Nothing is sweeter than love, nothing more pleasing than peace."

=== Interpretation ===
The lion of St. Mark the Evangelist, chosen in honor of the saint to whom is dedicated the parish he led before being appointed a bishop, stands on red, which is the color of love and blood. The umbraculum, the symbol of the Bishop of Rome, over a blue background, representing the detachment from earthly values and the ascent of the soul to God. At the bottom is a pomegranate, the symbol of the Passion of Christ, on a background of silver, which symbolizes the purity of the Virgin Mary to whom De Donatis entrusts his episcopal ministry.

== See also ==
- Cardinals created by Francis

== Notes ==
Catholic Church titles
Preceded by —	Auxiliary Bishop of Rome; 2015–2017	Succeeded by —
Preceded by Bernard Joseph McLaughlin	— TITULAR — Bishop of Mottola; 2015–2017	Succeeded by Himself as Archbishop of Mottola
Preceded by Himself as Bishop of Mottola	— TITULAR — Archbishop of Mottola; 2017–2018	Succeeded by Gianfranco Gallone
Preceded by Agostino Vallini	Vicar General of His Holiness for the Diocese of Rome; 2017–2024	Succeeded by Baldassare Reina
Preceded by Agostino Vallini	Archpriest of the Archbasilica of St. John Lateran; 2017–2024	Succeeded by Baldassare Reina
Preceded by Agostino Vallini	Grand Chancellor of the Pontifical Lateran University; 2017–2024	Succeeded by Baldassare Reina
Preceded by Agostino Vallini	Apostolic Administrator of the Suburbicarian Diocese of Ostia; 2017–2024	Succeeded by Baldassare Reina
Preceded by Marco Cé	Cardinal Protector of San Marco; 2018–present	Incumbent
Preceded by Mauro Piacenza	Major Penitentiary; 2024–present	Incumbent
