= Diocese of Rome =

Diocese of the Catholic Church in Rome, Italy

Diocese of Rome Dioecesis Urbis seu Romana Diocesi di Roma

Catholic

Location
- Country: Italy; Vatican City
- Territory: Rome; Worldwide (Note: Universal full communion, Latin Church, Eastern Catholic Churches, Catholic Church.)
- Ecclesiastical province: Rome; Worldwide
- Coordinates: 41°53′9.26″N 12°30′22.16″E

Statistics
- Area: 881 km^{2} (340 sq mi)
- Population: Total; Catholics: (as of 2013); 2,885,272; 2,365,923 (82%)
- Parishes: 334
- Churches: 711

Information
- Denomination: Catholic Church
- Sui iuris church: Latin Church
- Rite: Roman Rite
- Established: 1st century
- Cathedral: Archbasilica of Saint John Lateran
- Patron saint: Saint Peter; Saint Paul; Saint Catherine of Siena; Saint Philip Neri; Saint Lawrence of Rome
- Secular priests: 1,589

Current leadership
- Governance: Holy See
- Bishop: Pope Leo XIV
- Auxiliary Bishops: Renato Tarantelli Baccari; Stefano Sparapani; Alessandro Zenobbi; Andrea Carlevale; Marco Valenti
- Vicar General: Baldassare Reina
- Bishops emeritus: Agostino Vallini; Enzo Dieci; Paolino Schiavon; Guerino Di Tora; Paolo Selvadagi

Map
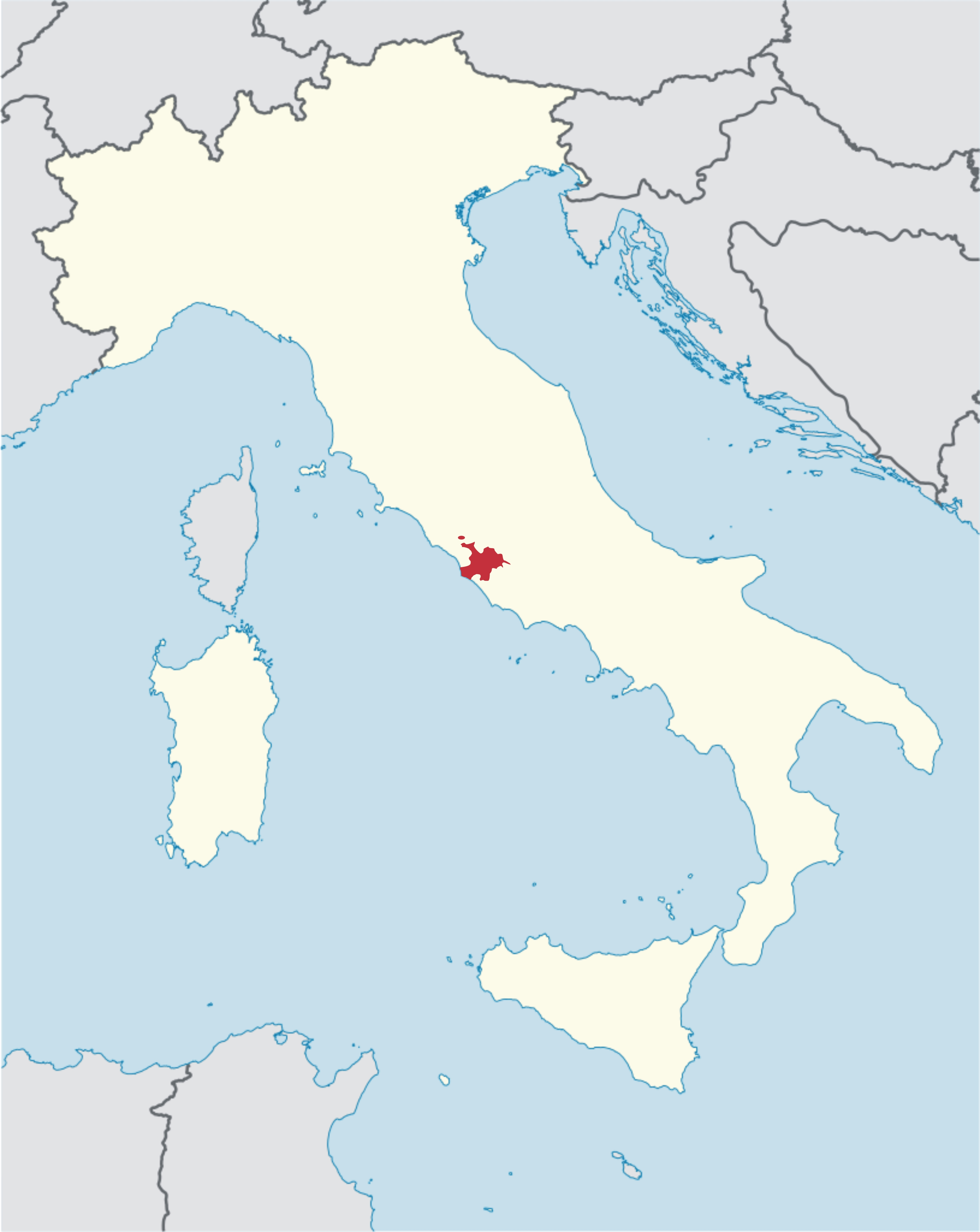

Website
- diocesidiroma.it

The Diocese of Rome (Latin: Dioecesis Urbis seu Romana; Italian: Diocesi di Roma) is a Latin diocese of the Catholic Church under the direct jurisdiction of the pope, who is Bishop of Rome and hence the supreme pontiff and head of the worldwide Catholic Church. As the Holy See, the papacy is a sovereign entity with diplomatic relations, and it has civil jurisdiction over Vatican City (located geographically within the city of Rome). The Diocese of Rome consists of two geographical jurisdictions: the Vicariate of Rome, and the small Vicariate of Vatican City. It is the metropolitan diocese of the Province of Rome, an ecclesiastical province in the Ecclesiastical Region of Lazio in Italy. According to Catholic tradition, the first bishop of Rome was Saint Peter during the first century.

Historically, many Rome-born men – as well as others born elsewhere on the Italian Peninsula – served as bishops of Rome. Since 1900, however, there has been only one Rome-born bishop of Rome, Pius XII (1939–1958). In addition, throughout history, non-Italians have served as bishops of Rome, beginning with the first of them according to Catholic tradition – Saint Peter.

The Diocese of Rome is the primatial see of Italy, and its cathedral is the Archbasilica of Saint John Lateran. The primate of Italy is the pope, holding primacy of honor over the Italian sees and also primacy of jurisdiction over all other episcopal sees by Catholic tradition.

== Titles ==
The pope is the Bishop of Rome, and some of his titles derive from this specific role. The official list of papal titles, in the order they are dictated by the Annuario Pontificio in 2024, is:

- Bishop of Rome (Episcopus Romanus)
- Vicar of Jesus Christ (Vicarius Iesu Christi)
- Successor of the Prince of the Apostles (Successor principis apostolorum)
- Supreme Pontiff of the Universal Church (Summus Pontifex Ecclesiae Universalis)
- Patriarch of the West (Patriarcha Occidentis)
- Primate of Italy (Primas Italiae)
- Metropolitan Archbishop of the Roman Province (Archiepiscopus metropolitanus provinciae Romanae)
- Sovereign of the Vatican City State (Superanus sui iuris civitatis Vaticanae)
- Servant of the Servants of God (Servus Servorum Dei)

The title "pope" is not in the official list, but is commonly used in the titles of documents, and appears, in abbreviated form, in papal signatures.

== History ==
=== Origins ===
The best evidence available for the origins of the Church in Rome is Saint Paul's Epistle to the Romans. This indicates that the church was established probably by the early 40s AD. Saint Peter became associated with this church sometime between the year 58 and the early 60s.

According to one historian:

The final years of the first century and the early years of the second constitute the "postapostolic" period, as reflected in the extrabiblical writings of Clement of Rome and Ignatius of Antioch. By now the church at Rome was exercising a pastoral care that extended beyond its own community, having replaced Jerusalem as the practical center of the growing universal Church. Appeals were made to Peter and Paul, with whom the Roman church was most closely identified.

=== Modern times ===
On 6 January 2023, by the apostolic constitution In Ecclesiarum Communione, Pope Francis reorganised the diocese to make it more collegial and to reinforce the role of the pope in it.

On 25 February 2026, Pope Leo XIV issued a special pontifical decree, revised In Ecclesiarum Communione and reorganizing the internal territorial boundaries and management of the sectors of the Diocese of Rome.

== Territory ==
The diocese covers a territory of 881 square kilometres (340 sq mi) of which 0.44 square kilometres (0.17 sq mi) is in the Vatican City State and the rest is in Italy. The diocese has 1,219 diocesan priests of its own, while 2,331 priests of other dioceses, 5,072 religious priests and 140 Opus Dei priests reside in its territory, as do 2,266 women religious. In 2004, they ministered to an estimated 2,454,000 faithful, who made up 88% of the population of the territory.

The city of Rome has grown beyond the boundaries of the diocese. Notable parts of the city belong to the dioceses of Ostia and Porto-Santa Rufina. Ostia is administered together with the Vicariate of Rome, and thus included in the statistics given below, while Porto is instead administered by its own diocesan bishop. The diocese covers an area of 849 km^{2} and includes most of the city and the municipality of Rome in Italy, and the entire territory of Vatican City. The Diocese of Rome is divided into two vicariates, each with its respective vicar general.

Two vicars general exercise the episcopal ministry and pastoral government for their respective territories within the Diocese of Rome. Unless the bishop of a diocese reserves some acts to himself, vicars general have by law within a diocese the power to undertake all administrative acts that pertain to the bishop except those that in law require a special mandate of the bishop.

=== Vicariate of Vatican City ===
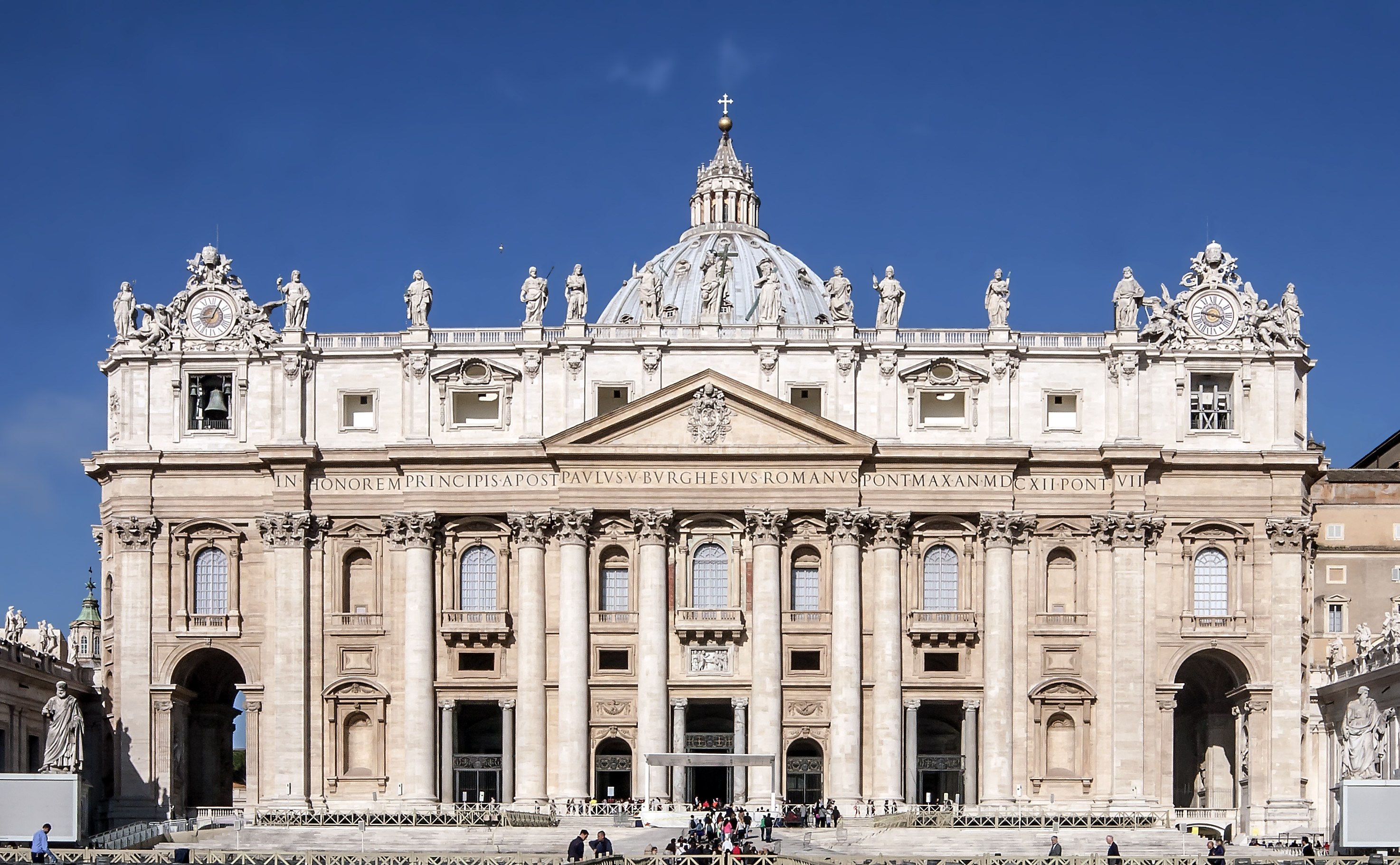
St. Peter's Basilica

This vicariate has responsibility for the territory of Vatican City. It consists of two parishes: Saint Peter's Basilica and Saint Anne in the Vatican. Its pastoral mission with respect to residents of its territory is minimal. It is primarily concerned with providing appropriate services to tourists, pilgrims, and others in Rome who avail themselves of services provided in Vatican City. Since 1991, the vicar general for Vatican City has been the prelate who is the archpriest of St. Peter's Basilica, currently Archbishop Vittorio Francesco Viola

Vicars general for Vatican City
No.	Image	Name (Birth–Death)	Term
1		Agostino Zampini, O.S.A. (1858–1937)	30 May 1929 – 7 June 1937 (7 years)
2		Alfonso Camillo De Romanis, O.S.A. (1885–1950)	20 August 1937 – 18 January 1950 (12 years)
3		Petrus Canisius Van Lierde, O.S.A. (1907–1995)	13 January 1951 – 14 January 1991 (40 years)
–		Aurelio Sabattani (1912–2003)	14 January 1991 – 1 July 1991 (acting)
4		Virgilio Noè (1922–2011)	1 July 1991 – 24 April 2002 (10 years)
5		Francesco Marchisano (1929–2014)	24 April 2002 – 5 February 2005 (2 years)
6		Angelo Comastri (born 1943)	5 February 2005 – 20 February 2021 (15 years)
7		Mauro Gambetti, O.F.M. Conv. (born 1965)	20 February 2021 – 3 October 2026 (5 years)
8		Vittorio Francesco Viola, O.F.M. (born 1965)	10 October 2026 – Present

=== Vicariate of Rome ===
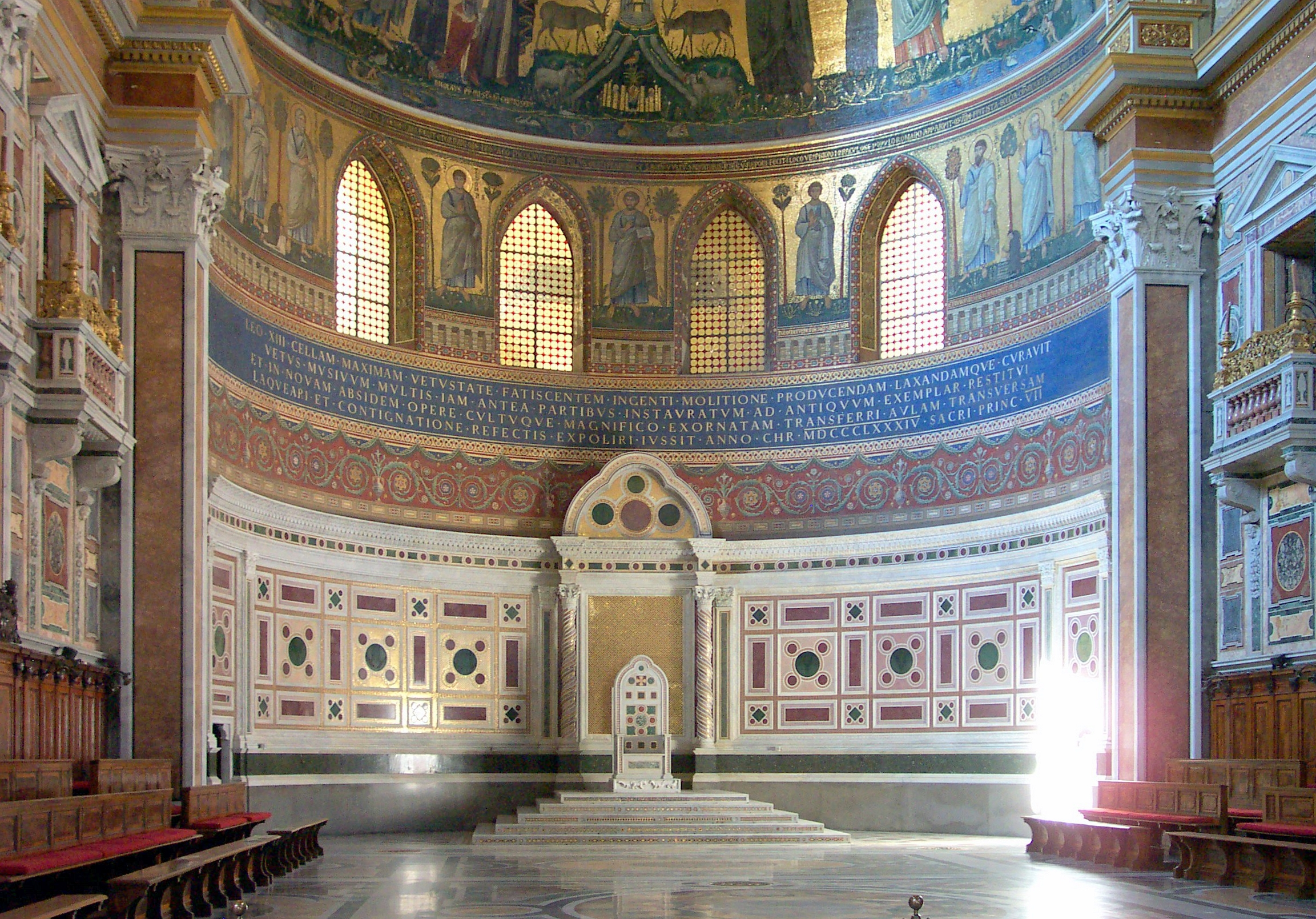
The Papal Cathedra, the throne of the Pope in the Archbasilica of Saint John Lateran

The vicariate general (Vicariatus urbis) for the diocesan territory outside of Vatican City, territory that is under Italian sovereignty, is based at the Archbasilica of Saint John Lateran, which is the cathedral of the diocese. The vicar general for the Vicariate of Rome has for centuries been called the cardinal vicar (Italian: Cardinale Vicario). The vicariate has 336 active and 5 suppressed parishes in its territory. Since 1970 the vicar of the city of Rome has also been assigned the office of archpriest of the Lateran Archbasilica, where the diocesan curia has its headquarters. From a strictly pastoral point of view, the diocese is divided into five sectors: north, south, east, west, and center. Each sector is assigned an auxiliary bishop who collaborates with the vicar general and the vicegerent in the pastoral administration of the diocese. The five bishops of the sectors can be joined by other auxiliary bishops for specific pastoral areas such as health care ministry.

In January 2023, Pope Francis reorganized the Diocese of Rome, greatly restricting the role of vicar general. He defined the role of each auxiliary bishop and took direct charge of many diocesan decisions. He defined the vicar general's role as a coordinator of the work of diocesan bodies, defined him as an auxiliary, and restricted his sphere of responsibility with the rule that the vicar general "will not undertake important initiatives or ones exceeding ordinary administration without first reporting to me".

== Ecclesiastical Province of Rome ==
=== Suburbicarian sees ===
Six of the dioceses of the Roman Province are described as suburbicarian. Each suburbicarian diocese has a cardinal bishop at its titular head.

- Suburbicarian See of Porto-Santa Rufina
- Suburbicarian See of Albano
- Suburbicarian See of Frascati
- Suburbicarian See of Palestrina
- Suburbicarian See of Sabina-Poggio Mirteto
- Suburbicarian See of Velletri-Segni

==== Diocese of Ostia ====
There remains the titular Suburbicarian See of Ostia, held, in addition to his previous suburbicarian see, by the cardinal bishop elected Dean of the College of Cardinals. The Diocese of Ostia was merged with the Diocese of Rome in 1962, and is now administered by a vicar general, in tight cooperation with the vicar general for Rome. It was also diminished to contain only the cathedral parish of Ostia, which in 2012 was divided into two parishes.

=== Suffragan sees ===
Other Italian dioceses having Rome as their metropolitan see:

- Archdiocese of Gaeta (non-Metropolitan)
- Diocese of Anagni-Alatri
- Diocese of Civita Castellana
- Diocese of Civitavecchia-Tarquinia
- Diocese of Frosinone-Veroli-Ferentino
- Diocese of Latina-Terracina-Sezze-Priverno
- Diocese of Rieti
- Diocese of Sora-Cassino-Aquino-Pontecorvo
- Diocese of Tivoli
- Diocese of Viterbo
- Territorial Abbey of Montecassino
- Territorial Abbey of Subiaco

== Other exempt (directly subject) sees ==
Numerous ordinaries and personal prelatures outside the province of Rome, worldwide, are "Exempt", i.e. "directly subject to the Holy See", not part of any ecclesiastical province, including:

- Various Latin Church dioceses directly subject to the Holy See, either due to the type of see, such as the missionary pre-diocesan Apostolic prefectures and Apostolic vicariates, (although a few are exceptionally joined to an ecclesiastical province) until their promotion to 'full' bishopric, or wherever the Vatican sees fit not to assign a specific see to a province
- Personal prelatures such as Opus Dei
- Apostolic exarchates, Eastern Catholic pre-diocesan sees
- Ordinariates for Eastern Catholic faithful, Eastern Catholic, where one or more rite-specific churches sui iuris lack any proper jurisdiction
- Personal ordinariates for former Anglicans
- Various military ordinariates for armed forces personnel

== See also ==
- Holy See
- Papal primacy
