= Baldassare Reina =

Italian Roman Catholic prelate

His Eminence Baldassare Reina
- Vicar General of Rome
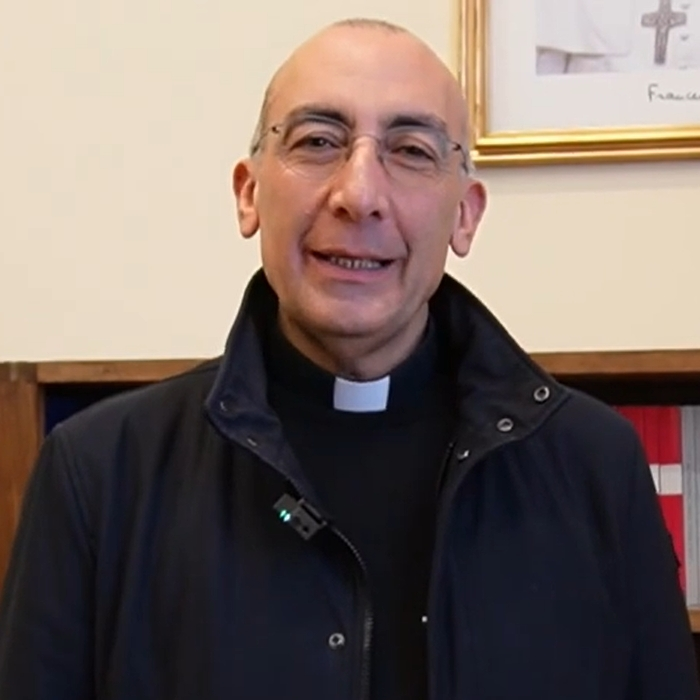
- Appointed: 6 October 2024
- Predecessor: Angelo De Donatis
- Other posts: Apostolic Administrator of the Diocese of Ostia (2024–present); Archpriest of the Papal Basilica of Saint John Lateran (2024–present); Cardinal-Priest of Santa Maria Assunta e San Giuseppe a Primavalle (2024–present); Grand Chancellor of the John Paul II Pontifical Theological Institute for Marriage and Family Sciences (2025–present)
- Previous posts: Auxiliary Bishop of Rome (2022–24); Titular Bishop of Acquae in Mauretania (2022–24); Vicegerent of the Diocese of Rome (2023–24); Titular Archbishop of Acquae in Mauretania (2024)

Orders
- Ordination: 8 September 1995 by Carmelo Ferraro
- Consecration: 27 May 2022 by Angelo De Donatis
- Created cardinal: 7 December 2024 by Pope Francis
- Rank: Cardinal-Priest

Personal details
- Born: 26 November 1970 (age 55) San Giovanni Gemini, Italy
- Motto: Caritas patiens est; (Love is patient)
- Coat of arms

Baldassare Reina (born 26 November 1970) is an Italian Catholic prelate who has served as vicar general of the Diocese of Rome since 2024. He previously served as an auxiliary bishop there from 2022 to 2024. He also served in his native Archdiocese of Agrigento for nine years as rector of the major seminary. Pope Francis made him a cardinal in 2024. He was made grand chancellor of the John Paul II Pontifical Theological Institute for Marriage and Family Sciences by Pope Leo XIV in 2025.

== Biography ==
Baldassare Reina was born on 26 November 1970 in San Giovanni Gemini, in the province of Agrigento. He entered the minor seminary of Agrigento in 1981 and studied philosophy and theology at the Pontifical Gregorian University, earning a bachelor's degree in sacred theology in 1995. On 8 September 1995 he was ordained a priest for the diocese of Agrigento by Bishop Carmelo Ferraro. He obtained a licentiate in biblical theology at the Gregorian in 1998.

From 1998 to 2001 he was diocesan assistant of Catholic Action and vice-rector of the Agrigento seminary. From 2001 to 2003 he was parish priest of Beata Maria Vergine dell'Itria parish in Favara. From 2003 to 2009 he was prefect of studies at the San Gregorio Agrigentino Theological Institute and from 2009 to 2013 parish priest of San Leone in Agrigento. From 2013 to 2022 he was rector of the Agrigento seminary. Within his archdiocese he was, for various periods, professor of sacred scripture at the Higher Institute of Religious Sciences, a permanent professor at the San Gregorio Agrigentino Theological Institute, director of the Archdiocesan Culture Office, a canon of the cathedral chapter, and a member of the priests council and the college of consultants.

He joined the staff of the Dicastery for the Clergy in 2022.

On 27 May 2022, Pope Francis appointed him titular bishop of Acquae in Mauretania and auxiliary bishop of Rome. He received his episcopal consecration alongside two other new auxiliaries of Rome on 29 June in the Basilica of St. John Lateran from Cardinal Angelo De Donatis, Vicar of the Diocese of Rome. He was given responsibility for the pastoral care of the western sector of the Diocese.

On 6 January 2023, Pope Francis named him vicegerent of the Diocese of Rome and raised him to the rank of archbishop. At the Vicariate of Rome he was responsible for the administration of assets, legal affairs, the general secretariat, and the protection of minors and vulnerable persons. When the office of the vicar general for the Diocese of Rome became vacant on 6 April 2024, Reina as vicegerent assumed the responsibilities of that office on a provisional basis. On the same day he was named apostolic administrator of the Diocese of Ostia. His appointments for the Diocese of Rome occurred as Pope Francis undertook a reorganization of its organization and management, with Reina selected to put Francis' new program into effect.

On 6 October 2024, Pope Francis announced that he planned to make Reina a cardinal on 8 December, a date that was later changed to 7 December, and that Reina was now the vicar general of the Diocese of Rome. On 25 October Pope Francis added the role of Archpriest of the Papal Basilica of Saint John Lateran to his responsibilities and raised him to the rank of archbishop.

On 7 December 2024, Pope Francis made him a cardinal, assigning him as Cardinal-Priest of Santa Maria Assunta e San Giuseppe a Primavalle.

He participated as a cardinal elector in the 2025 papal conclave that elected Pope Leo XIV. Pope Leo XIV appointed him grand chancellor of the John Paul II Pontifical Theological Institute for Marriage and Family Sciences on 19 May 2025.

== See also ==
- Cardinals created by Francis
