= Universal machine (disambiguation) =

A Universal Turing machine, often just called a universal machine, is an abstract computational device that can simulate other computational devices.

Universal machine may also refer to:

- Programmable Universal Machine for Assembly
- Machines made by Universal Gym Equipment
- The Universal Machine, a mini-series of the Bureau for Paranormal Research and Defense comic books
- The Universal Machine: Confessions of a Technological Optimist, a book by Pamela McCorduck
- Universal measuring machine

== See also ==
- Santucci's Armillary Sphere, said to represent the "universal machine" of the world
