= Luminous discharge tubes =

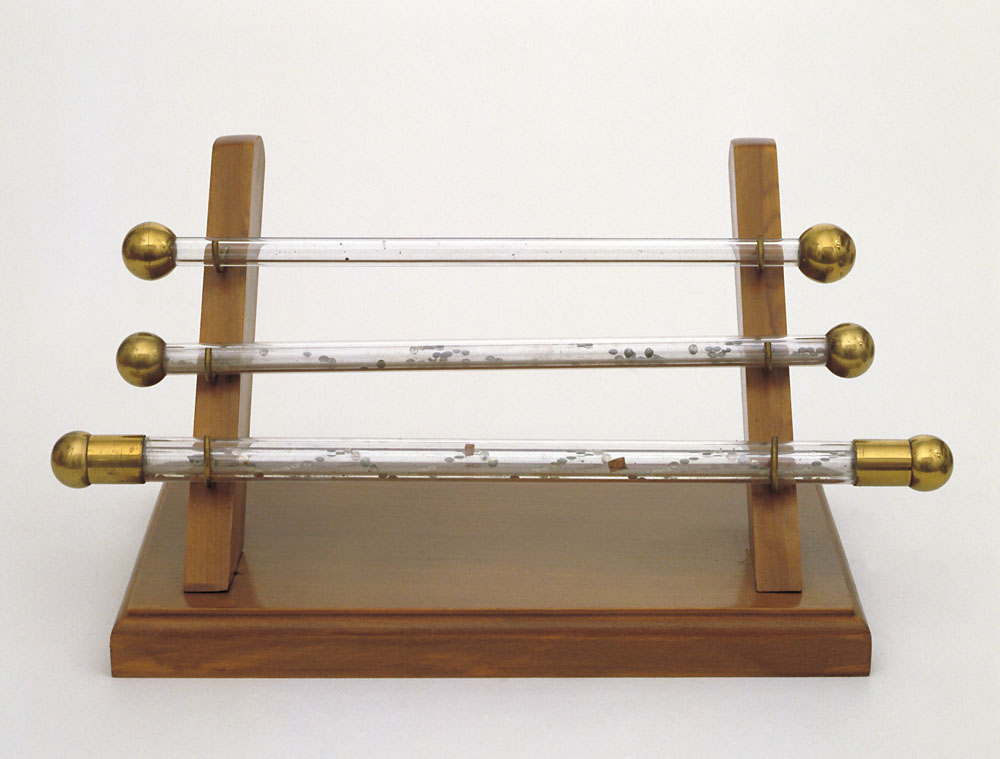
Luminous discharge tubes. Lorraine collections of the Museo Galileo, Florence

The luminous discharge tube is part of an electric machine.

Two small tubes, known as "electric serpents" or "fulminating tubes", were popular in the late eighteenth century because of the spectacular effect that they produced in the dark. The electric snake consists of two glass tubes, one inside the other. On the outside of the inner tube, a series of tin-foil patches are glued at short but equal intervals, forming a helical pattern. The outer tube is fitted with brass collars at both ends, which are in contact with the outermost patches of the helix. When one end of the tube is held in the hand and the other approaches the prime conductor of an electrical machine, scintillating sparks appear between each of the tin-foil patches, producing a long helix of fire.

== Bibliography ==
- Miniati, Mara, ed. (1991). Museo di storia della scienza: catalogo (in Italian). Firenze: Giunti. p. 250, board n. 61. ISBN 88-09-20036-5.
- Hackmann, Willem D., ed. (1995). Catalogue of pneumatical, magnetical and electrical instruments (in Italian). Firenze: Giunti. p. 148, boards n. 182-184. ISBN 88-09-20732-7.
