= Lorenzo Selva =

Italian scientific instrument maker

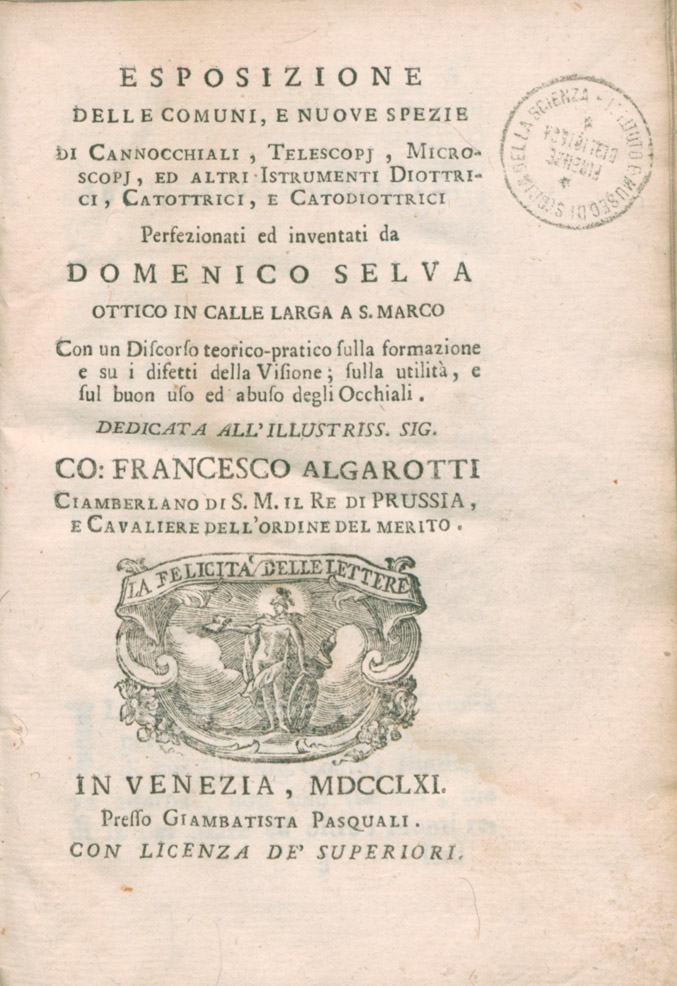
Esposizione delle comuni, e nuove spezie di cannocchiali, telescopi, microscopi, ed altri istrumenti diottrici, catottrici, e catodiottrici, 1761

Lorenzo Selva (1716 – c. 1790) was an Italian scientific instrument maker.

A Venetian optician, Lorenzo Selva worked for 33 years with his father Domenico Selva (?–1758) and continued the business after the latter's death. He made several optical instruments. Remarkably, he signed them with his father's name: "To show my ever-greater awareness and gratitude, every work of mine, every improvement and invention, will always be stamped, not with my name but with his beloved one." He described his father's work and the instruments produced in his optical laboratory in Esposizione delle comuni, e nuove spezie di Cannocchiali, Telescopj, Microscopj, ed altri Istrumenti Diottrici, Catottrici, e Catodiottrici Perfezionati ed inventati da Domenico Selva ottico [...] (Venice, 1761). Lorenzo is also the author of Sei dialoghi ottico teorico-pratici [Six theoretical-practical optical dialogues] (Venice, 1787). Some of his instruments are shown in the Museo Galileo in Florence, Italy.

== Works ==
- Esposizione delle comuni, e nuove spezie di cannocchiali, telescopi, microscopi, ed altri istrumenti diottrici, catottrici, e catodiottrici (in Italian). Venezia: Giovanni Battista Pasquali. 1761.
- Sei dialoghi ottici teorico-pratici (in Italian). Venezia: Simone Occhi. 1787.
