= Antonio Santucci =

Antonio Santucci (?–1613) was an Italian astronomer, cosmographer, and scientific instrument maker.

He was a reader in Mathematics at the University of Pisa during 1599–1612. Santucci was an astronomer and cosmographer to Grand Duke Ferdinand I (1549–1609) and later Cosimo II (1590–1621). An attentive observer of comets, most notably that of 1582, he published in 1611 the first edition of Trattato delle comete, in which he argued that, contrary to the prevailing scientific opinion, comets were not atmospheric phenomena. The following year, he wrote Breve discorso sopra il trattato galileiano sulle galleggianti (which survives in manuscript at the National Central Library). He also authored a treatise in 1593, commissioned by Ferdinand I, on the mathematical and surveying instruments in the Guardaroba Medicea collection. His monumental armillary spheres are famous. One sphere, made in 1582 for King Philip II of Spain, is now at the Escorial in Madrid; the other, the most famous Santucci's Armillary Sphere, built in 1588–1593 for the Sala delle Matematiche in the Uffizi, is now at the Museo Galileo of Florence.
