= Paolo Galluzzi =

Italian historian of science (1942–2026)

Paolo Galluzzi (23 April 1942 – 29 October 2026) was an Italian historian of science.

== Life and career ==
Galluzzi was born on 23 April 1942.

He was director of the Museo Galileo – Istituto e Museo di Storia della Scienza in Florence, Italy beginning in 1982. Galluzzi held the chair of History of Science at the University of Siena from 1979 to 1994, then at the University of Florence from 1994 to 2010. He was editor-in-chief of Nuncius, an international journal for the history of science, from 1991 until 2007. He sat on the scientific boards of important journals and cultural institutions in Italy and abroad. He was assigned chairman of the International Scientific Committee by the Nobel Foundation to create the Nobel Museum in Stockholm. He chaired the Advisory Boards of the National Edition of Leonardo da Vinci’s Manuscripts and Drawings and of the Updates to the National Edition of Galileo Galilei’s Work. He was a member of the Royal Swedish Academy of Sciences, the American Philosophical Society and the Accademia Nazionale dei Lincei. His research focused on the following topics: Leonardo da Vinci, Renaissance scientists and engineers, Galileo and his School, European scientific academies, history of scientific instruments, museums and scientific collecting, historiography of science, and the history of scientific research in post-Unification Italy. He also developed many plans for research organization and dissemination of scientific culture.

Galluzzi conceived a number of historical scientific exhibitions which have been displayed in Italy and abroad, as well as information systems and multimedia on the history of science and technology.

Galluzzi died on 29 October 2026, at the age of 84.

== Works ==
Galluzzi was the author of many works on the topics dealt with in his research. Among the most recently published books: Tra atomi e indivisibili. La materia ambigua di Galileo, Firenze, Olschki, 2011, ISBN 9788822260888, and «Libertà di filosofare in naturalibus». I mondi paralleli di Cesi e Galileo, Roma, Accademia Nazionale dei Lincei, 2014, ISBN 9788821810923. He was director of the Storia della Scienza published by Einaudi and of the “Biblioteca della Scienza Italiana” series. He also edited the catalogues of the exhibitions he conceived.

== See also ==
- Museo Galileo
- Galileo Galilei
- Leonardo da Vinci
- Accademia Nazionale dei Lincei
