= Domenico Selva =

Italian scientific instrument maker

Domenico Selva (?–1758) was an Italian scientific instrument maker.

Domenico Selva was from the Veneto region in the Republic of Venice. He had an optical workshop in Venice near Piazza San Marco and used his skills to develop lenses, telescopes, and microscopes. His works were documented in a book by his son Lorenzo Selva, who was inspired by his father to become an optician himself.
