= Armillary sphere =

Model of objects in the sky consisting of a framework of rings

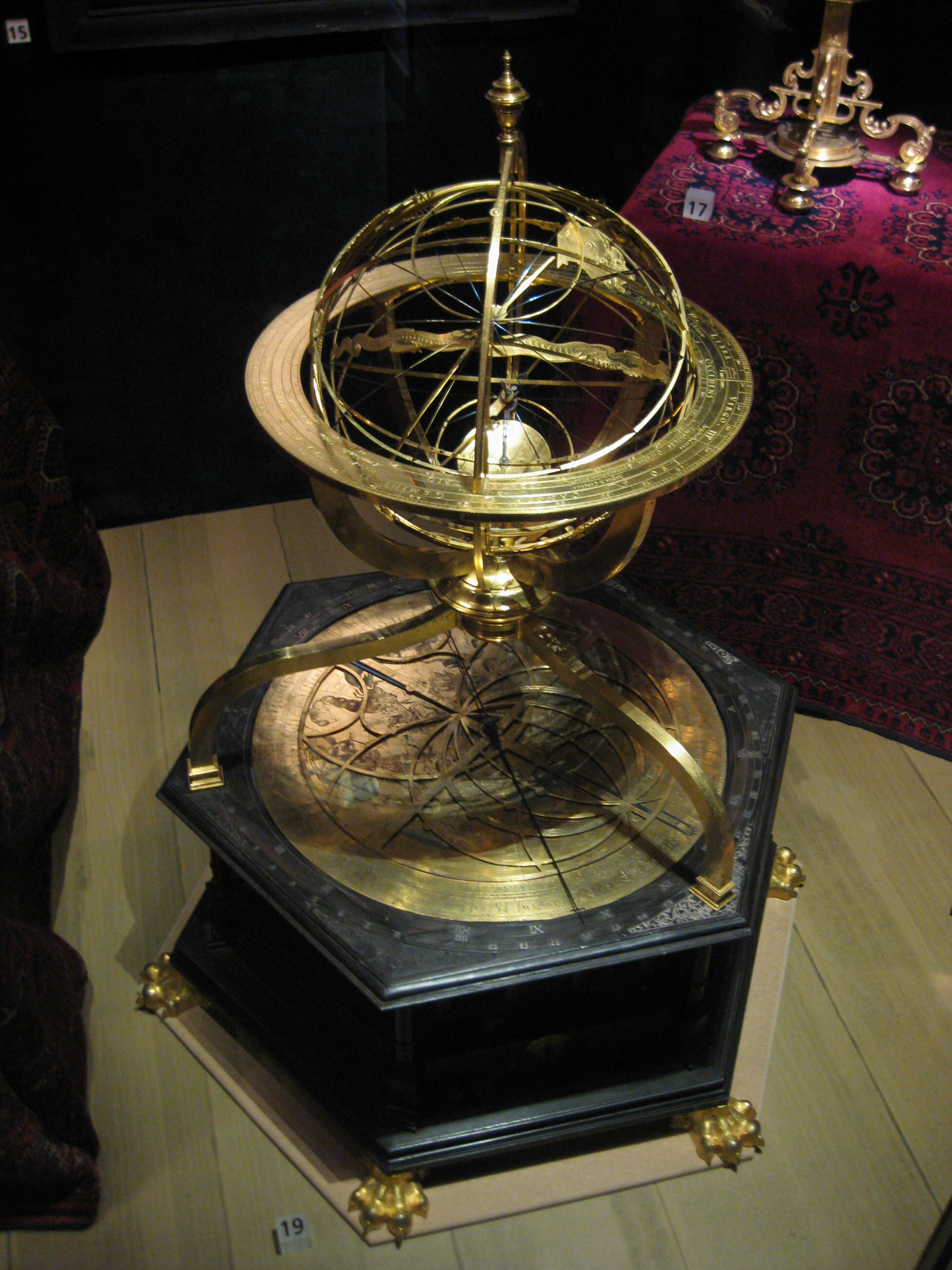
Jost Bürgi and Antonius Eisenhoit: Armillary sphere with astronomical clock, made in 1585 in Kassel, now at Nordiska Museet in Stockholm

An armillary sphere (variations are known as spherical astrolabe, armilla, or armil) is a model of objects in the sky (on the celestial sphere), consisting of a spherical framework of rings, centered on Earth or the Sun, that represent lines of celestial coordinate system and other astronomically important features, such as the ecliptic. As such, it differs from a celestial globe, which is a smooth sphere whose principal purpose is to map the constellations. It was invented separately, in ancient China possibly as early as the 4th century BC and ancient Greece during the 3rd century BC, with later uses in the Islamic world and Medieval Europe.

With the Earth as center, an armillary sphere is known as Geocentric model . With the Sun as center, it is known as Copernican.

The flag of Portugal features an armillary sphere. The armillary sphere is also featured in Portuguese heraldry, associated with the Portuguese discoveries during the Age of Discovery. Manuel I of Portugal, for example, took it as one of his symbols where it appeared on his standard, and on early Chinese export ceramics made for the Portuguese court. In the flag of the Empire of Brazil, the armillary sphere is also featured.

The Beijing Capital International Airport Terminal 3 features a large armillary sphere metal sculpture as an exhibit of Chinese inventions for international and domestic visitors.

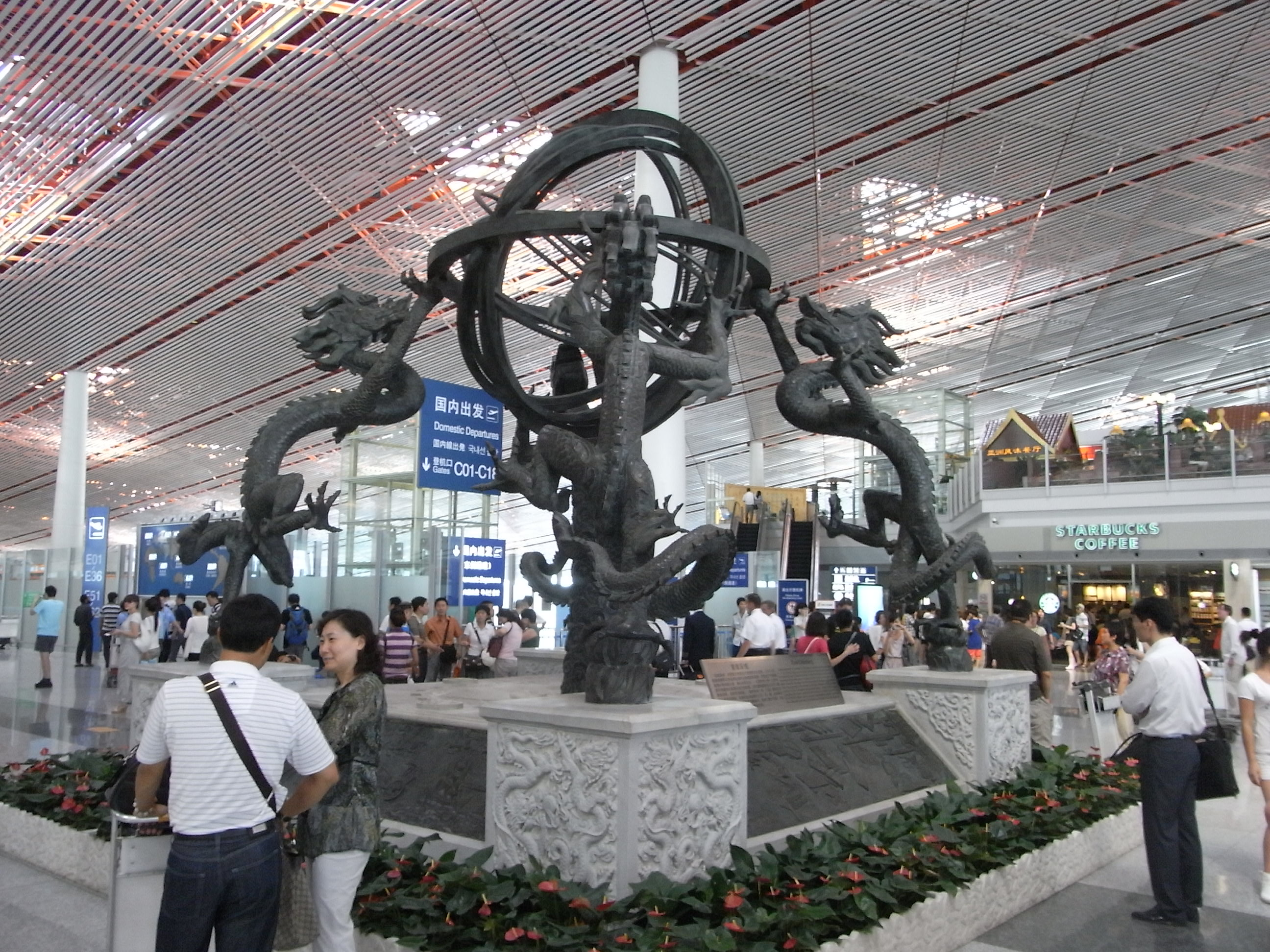
Chinese Armillary sphere at Beijing Capital International Airport Ziwei Chenheng Aug-2010

== Description and use ==
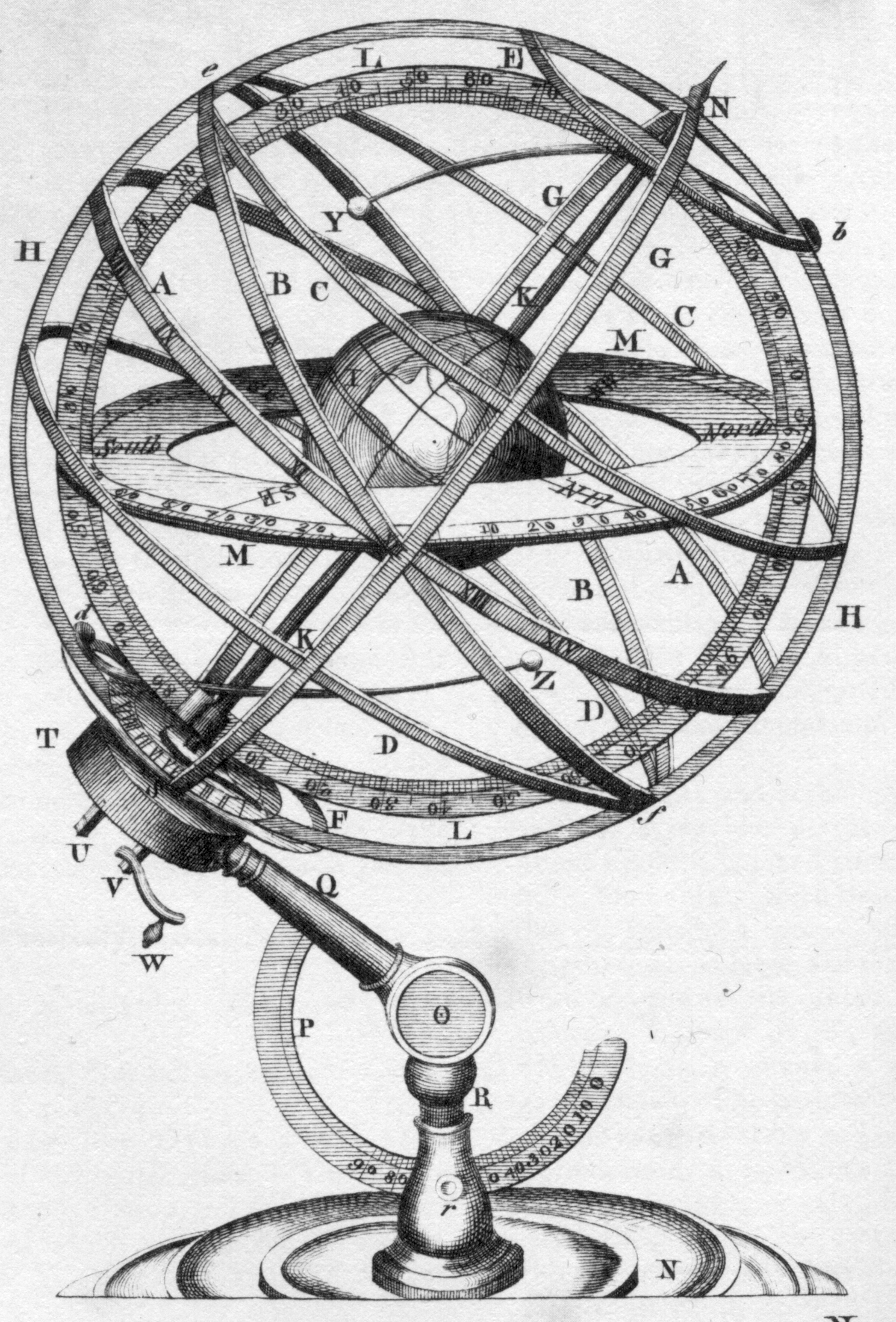
Armillary sphere diagram

The exterior parts of this machine are a compages [or framework] of brass rings, which represent the principal circles of the heavens:

1. The equinoctial A, which is divided into 360 degrees (beginning at its intersection with the ecliptic in Aries) for showing the sun's right ascension in degrees; and also into 24 hours, for showing its right ascension in time.
2. The ecliptic B, which is divided into 12 signs, and each sign into 30 degrees, and also into the months and days of the year, in such a manner that the degree or point of the ecliptic on which the sun appears, on any given day, stands over that day in the circle of months.
3. The tropic of Cancer C, touching the ecliptic at the beginning of Cancer in e, and the tropic of Capricorn D, touching the ecliptic at the beginning of Capricorn (constellation) in f; each circle 23 1/2 degrees from the equinoctial circle.
4. The Arctic Circle E, and the Antarctic Circle F, each circle 23 1/2 degrees from its respective pole at N and S.
5. The equinoctial colure G, passing through the north and south poles of the heavens at N and S, and through the equinoctial points in Aries and Libra, in the ecliptic.
6. The solstitial colure H, passing through the poles of the heavens, and through the solstitial points in Cancer and Capricorn, in the ecliptic. Each quarter of the equinoctial colure is divided into 90 degrees, from the equinoctial to the poles of the world, for showing the declination of the sun, moon, and stars; and each quarter of the solstitial colure, from the ecliptic as e and f, to its poles b and d, for showing the Celestial latitude of the stars.

In the north pole of the ecliptic is a nut b, to which is fixed one end of the quadrantal wire. To the other end is a small sun Y, which is carried around the ecliptic B—B, by turning the nut. In the south pole of the ecliptic is a pin d, on which another quadrantal wire is situated, with a small moon Ζ upon it, which may be moved around by hand. A mechanism causes the moon to move in an orbit which crosses the ecliptic at an angle of 5 1/3 degrees, to opposite points called the lunar nodes, and allows for shifting these points backward in the ecliptic, as the lunar nodes shift in the heavens.

Within these circular rings is a small terrestrial globe I, fixed on an axis K, which extends from the north and south poles of the globe at n and s, to those of the celestial sphere at N and S. On this axis the flat celestial meridian L is fixed, which may be set directly over the meridian of any place on the globe, so as to keep over the same meridian upon it. This flat meridian is graduated the same way as the brass meridian of the common globe, and its use is much the same.

To this globe is fitted the movable horizon M, so as to turn upon the two strong wires proceeding from its east and west points to the globe and entering the globe at the opposite points off its equator, which is a movable brass ring set into the globe in a groove all around its equator. The globe may be turned by hand within this ring, so as to place any given meridian upon it, directly under the celestial meridian L. The horizon is divided into 360 degrees all around its outermost edge, within which are the points of the compass, for showing the amplitude of the sun and the moon, both in degrees and points. The celestial meridian L passes through two notches in the north and south points of the horizon, as in a common globe: if the globe is turned around, the horizon and meridian turn with it. At the south pole of the sphere is a circle of 25 hours, fixed to the rings. On the axis is an index which goes around that circle, if the globe is turned around its axis.

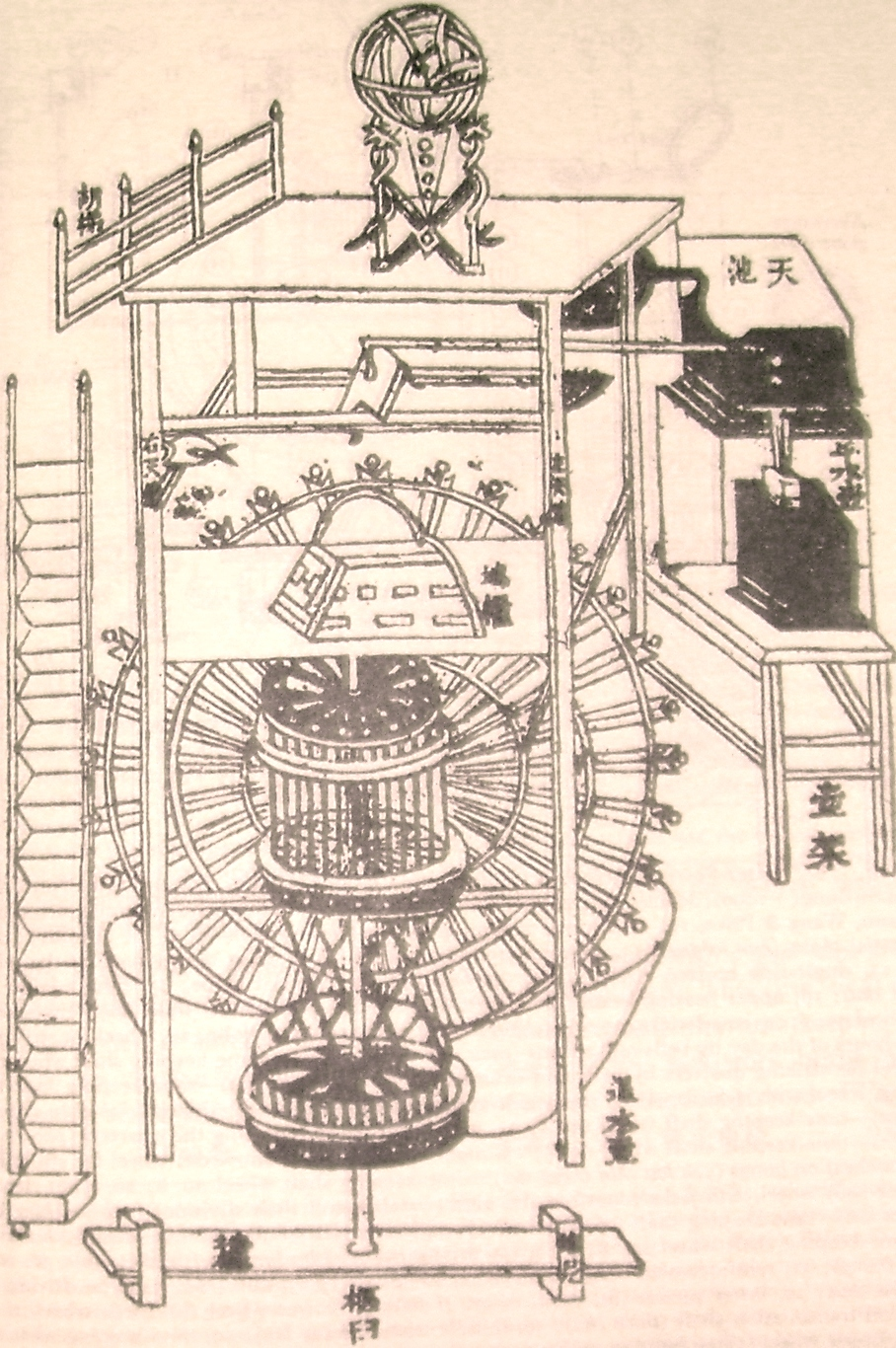
The original diagram of Chinese scientist Su Song's book of 1092 showing the inner workings of his clocktower; a mechanically rotated armillary sphere crowns the top.

The globe assembly is supported on a pedestal N, and may be elevated or depressed upon the joint O, to any number of degrees from 0 to 90 by means of the arc P, which is fixed in the strong brass arm Q. The globe assembly slides in the upright piece R, in which is a screw at r, to fix it at any proper elevation.

In the box T are two wheels (as in Dr Long's sphere) and two pinions, whose axes come out at V and U; either of which may be turned by the small winch W. When the winch is put upon the axis V, and turned backward, the terrestrial globe, with its horizon and celestial meridian, keep at rest; and the whole sphere of circles turns round from east, by south, to west, carrying the sun Y, and moon Z, round the same way, and causing them to rise above and set below the horizon. But when the winch is put upon the axis U, and turned forward, the sphere with the sun and moon keep at rest; and the earth, with its horizon and meridian, turn round from horizon to the sun and moon, to which these bodies came when the earth kept at rest, and they were carried round it; showing that they rise and set in the same points of the horizon, and at the same times in the hour circle, whether the motion be in the earth or in the heaven. If the earthly globe be turned, the hour-index goes round its hour-circle; but if the sphere be turned, the hour-circle goes round below the index. And so, by this construction, the machine is equally fitted to show either the real motion of the earth, or the apparent motion of the heavens. To reset the sphere for use, one must first slacken the screw r in the upright stem R, and taking hold of the arm Q, move it up or down until the given degree of latitude for any place lies at the side of the stem R; then the axis of the sphere will be properly elevated, so as to stand parallel to the axis of the terrestrial globe, if the globe assembly is to be aligned to north and south by a small compass: once this is done, the user must count the latitude from the north pole, upon the celestial meridian L, down towards the north notch of the horizon, and set the horizon to that latitude. The user then must turn the nut b until the sun Y comes to the given day of the year in the ecliptic, and the sun will be at its proper place for that day.

To find the place of the moon's ascending node, and also the place of the moon, an ephemeris must be consulted to set them right accordingly. Lastly, the user must turn the winch W, until either the sun comes to the meridian L, or until the meridian comes to the sun (moving the sphere or globe at the user's discretion), and then set the hour-index to the XII, marked noon, the whole sphere will be reset. Then the user must turn the winch, and observe when the sun or moon rises and sets in the horizon. The hour-index will show the times thereof for the given day.

== History ==
=== China ===
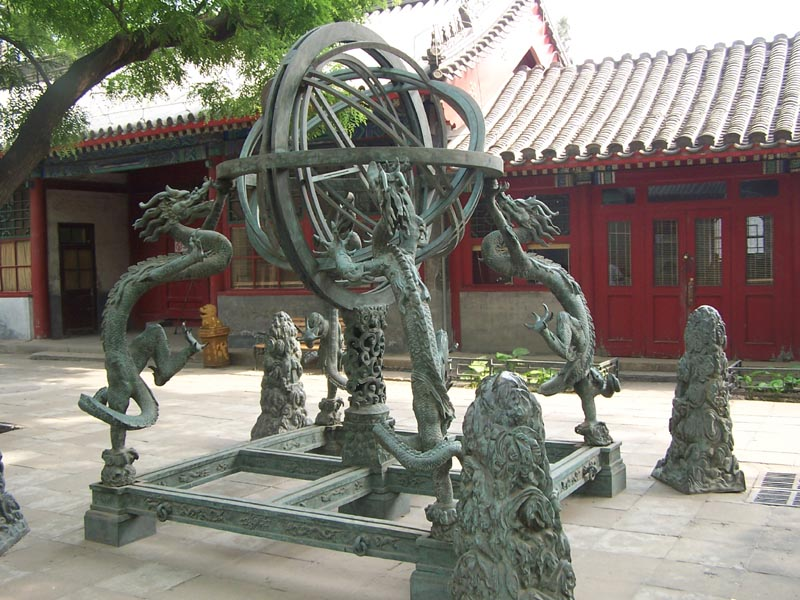
Armillary sphere at Beijing Ancient Observatory, replica of an original from the Ming dynasty

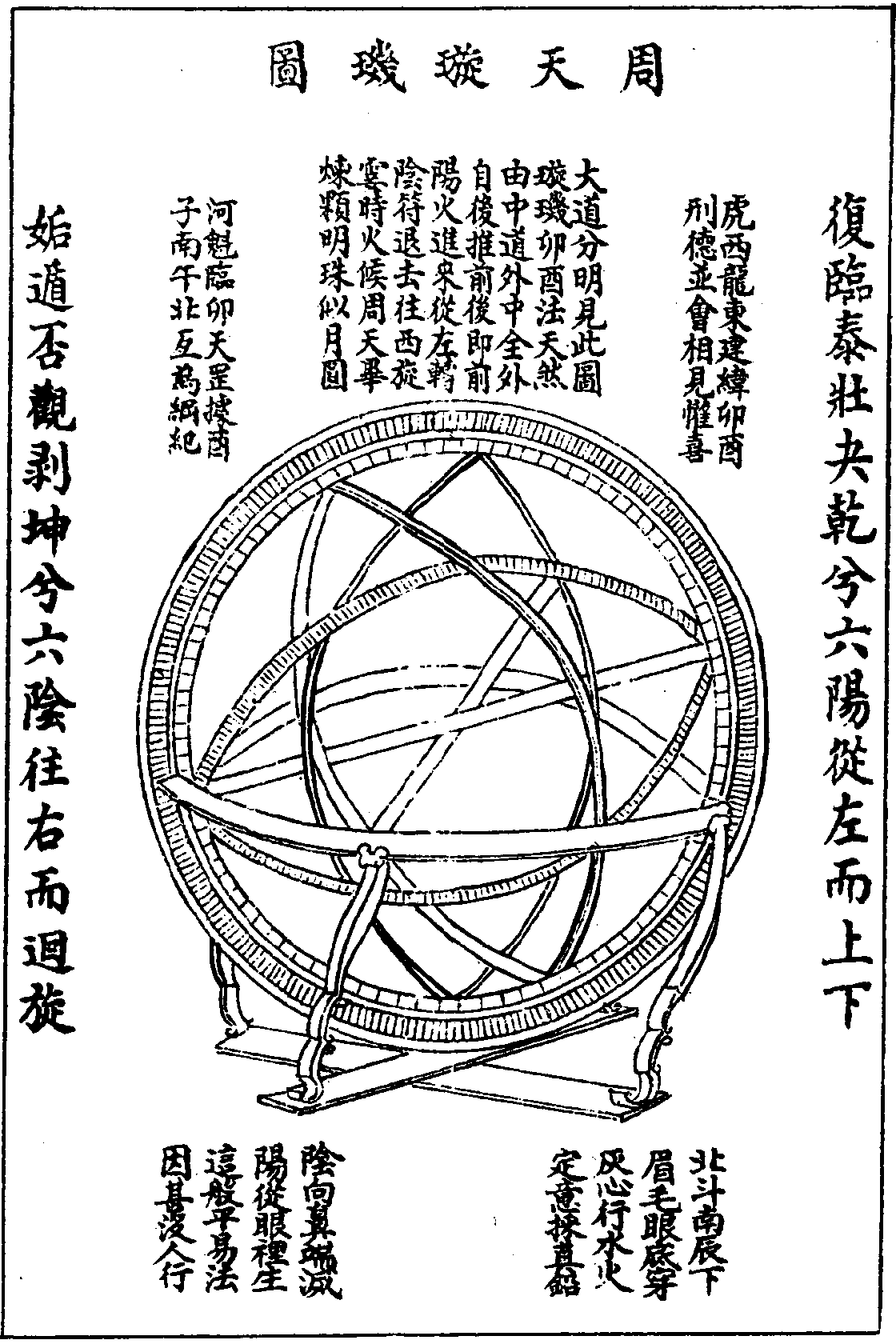
Armillary Sphere 周天璇璣圖, 1615 Xingming guizhi

Throughout Chinese history, astronomers have created celestial globes (Chinese: 渾象; pinyin: húnxiàng) to assist the observation of the stars. The Chinese also used the armillary sphere in aiding calendrical computations and calculations.

According to Joseph Needham, the earliest development of the armillary sphere in China goes back to the astronomers Shi Shen and Gan De in the 4th century BC, as they were equipped with a primitive single-ring armillary instrument. This would have allowed them to measure the north polar distance (declination) a measurement that gave the position in a xiu (right ascension). Needham's 4th century BC dating, however, is rejected by British sinologist Christopher Cullen, who traces the beginnings of these devices to the 1st century BC.

During the Western Han dynasty (202 BC – 9 AD) additional developments made by the astronomers Luoxia Hong (落下閎), Xiangyu Wangren, and Geng Shouchang (耿壽昌) advanced the use of the armillary in its early stage of evolution. In 52 BC, it was the astronomer Geng Shouchang who introduced the first permanently fixed equatorial ring of the armillary sphere. In the subsequent Eastern Han dynasty (23–220 AD) period, the astronomers Fu An and Jia Kui added the ecliptic ring by 84 AD. With the famous statesman, astronomer, and inventor Zhang Heng (張衡, 78–139 AD), the sphere was totally complete in 125 AD, with horizon and meridian rings. The world's first water-powered celestial globe was created by Zhang Heng, who operated his armillary sphere by use of an inflow clepsydra clock.

Subsequent developments were made after the Han dynasty that improved the use of the armillary sphere. In 323 AD the Chinese astronomer Kong Ting was able to reorganize the arrangement of rings on the armillary sphere so that the ecliptic ring could be pegged on to the equator at any point desired. The Chinese astronomer and mathematician Li Chunfeng (李淳風) of the Tang dynasty created one in 633 AD with three spherical layers to calibrate multiple aspects of astronomical observations, calling them 'nests' (chhung). He was also responsible for proposing a plan of having a sighting tube mounted ecliptically in order for the better observation of celestial latitudes. However, it was the Tang Chinese astronomer, mathematician, and monk Yi Xing in the next century who would accomplish this addition to the model of the armillary sphere. Ecliptical mountings of this sort were found on the armillary instruments of Zhou Cong and Shu Yijian in 1050, as well as Shen Kuo's armillary sphere of the later 11th century, but after that point they were no longer employed on Chinese armillary instruments until the arrival of the Europeans in Medieval China.

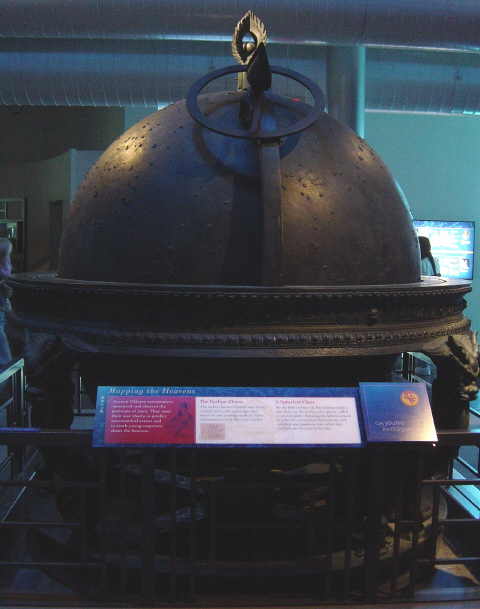
Celestial globe replica.

In 723 AD, Yi Xing (一行) and government official Liang Ling-zan (梁令瓚) combined Zhang Heng's water powered celestial globe with an escapement device. With drums hit every quarter-hour and bells rung automatically every full hour, the device was also a striking clock. The famous clock tower that the Chinese polymath Su Song built by 1094 during the Song dynasty would employ Yi Xing's escapement with waterwheel scoops filled by clepsydra drip, and powered a crowning armillary sphere, a central celestial globe, and mechanically operated manikins that would exit mechanically opened doors of the clock tower at specific times to ring bells and gongs to announce the time, or to hold plaques announcing special times of the day. There was also the scientist and statesman Shen Kuo (1031–1095). Being the head official for the Bureau of Astronomy, Shen Kuo was an avid scholar of astronomy, and improved the designs of several astronomical instruments: the gnomon, armillary sphere, clepsydra clock, and sighting tube fixed to observe the pole star indefinitely. When Jamal al-Din of Bukhara was asked to set up an 'Islamic Astronomical Institution' in Beijing, he commissioned a number of astronomical instruments, including an armillary sphere. It was noted that "Chinese astronomers had been building [them] since at least 1092".

=== Indian Subcontinent ===
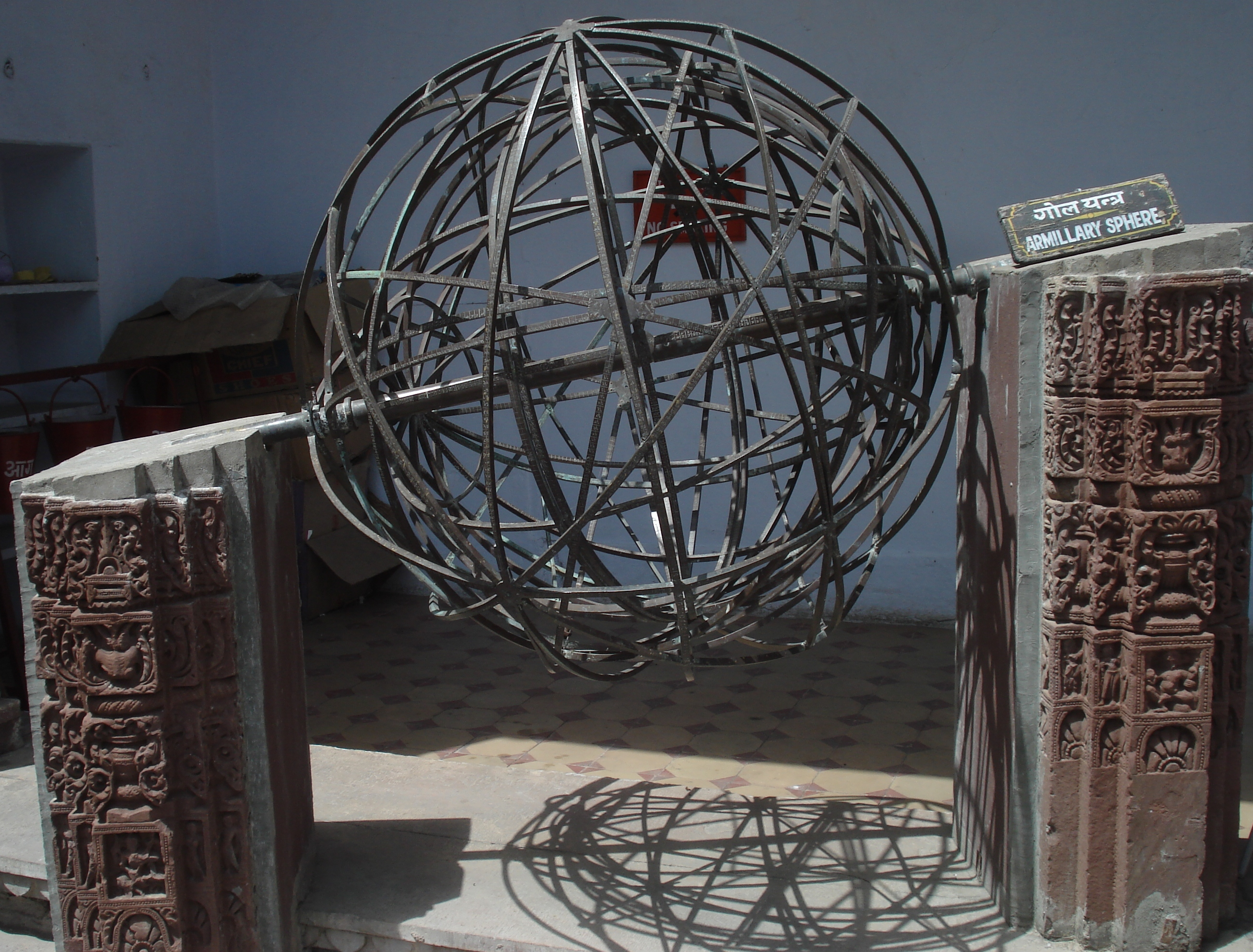
Armillary sphere at the Garh Palace, Kota

The armillary sphere was used for observation in India since early times, and finds mention in the works of Āryabhata (476 CE). The Goladīpikā—a detailed treatise dealing with globes and the armillary sphere was composed between 1380 and 1460 CE by Parameśvara. On the subject of the usage of the armillary sphere in India, Ōhashi (2008) writes: "The Indian armillary sphere (gola-yantra) was based on equatorial coordinates, unlike the Greek armillary sphere, which was based on ecliptical coordinates, although the Indian armillary sphere also had an ecliptical hoop. Probably, the celestial coordinates of the junction stars of the lunar mansions were determined by the armillary sphere since the seventh century or so."

=== Hellenistic world and ancient Rome ===
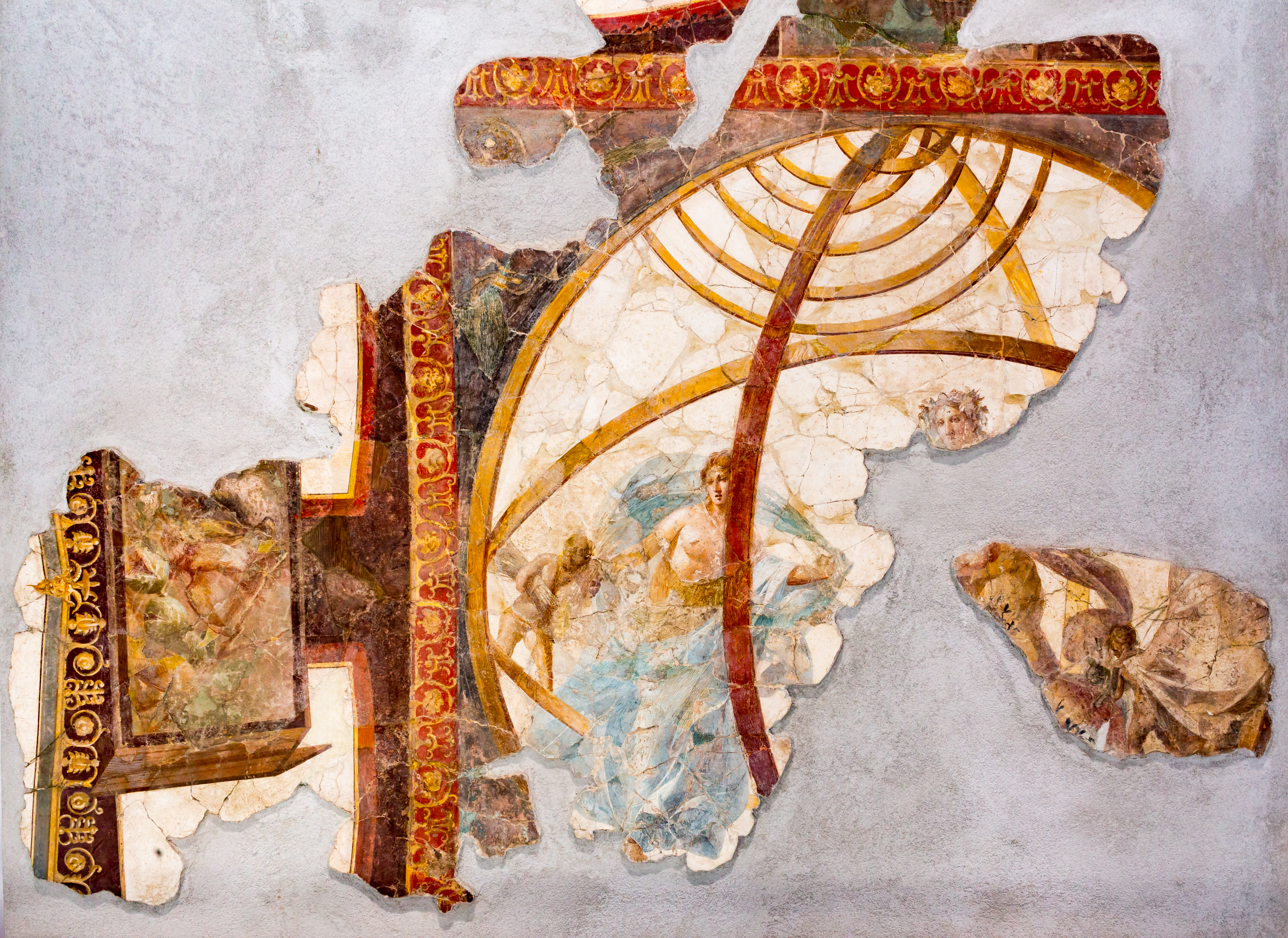
Mythological figures within an armillary sphere in a fragmentary fresco from Stabiae, mid-1st century AD

The Greek astronomer Hipparchus (c. 190 – c. 120 BC) credited Eratosthenes (276 – 194 BC) as the inventor of the armillary sphere. Names of this device in Greek include ἀστρολάβος astrolabos and κρικωτὴ σφαῖρα krikōtē sphaira "ringed sphere". The English name of this device comes ultimately from the Latin armilla (circle, bracelet), since it has a skeleton made of graduated metal circles linking the poles and representing the equator, the ecliptic, meridians and parallels. Usually a ball representing the Earth or, later, the Sun is placed in its center. It is used to demonstrate the motion of the stars around the Earth. Before the advent of the European telescope in the 17th century, the armillary sphere was the prime instrument of all astronomers in determining celestial positions.

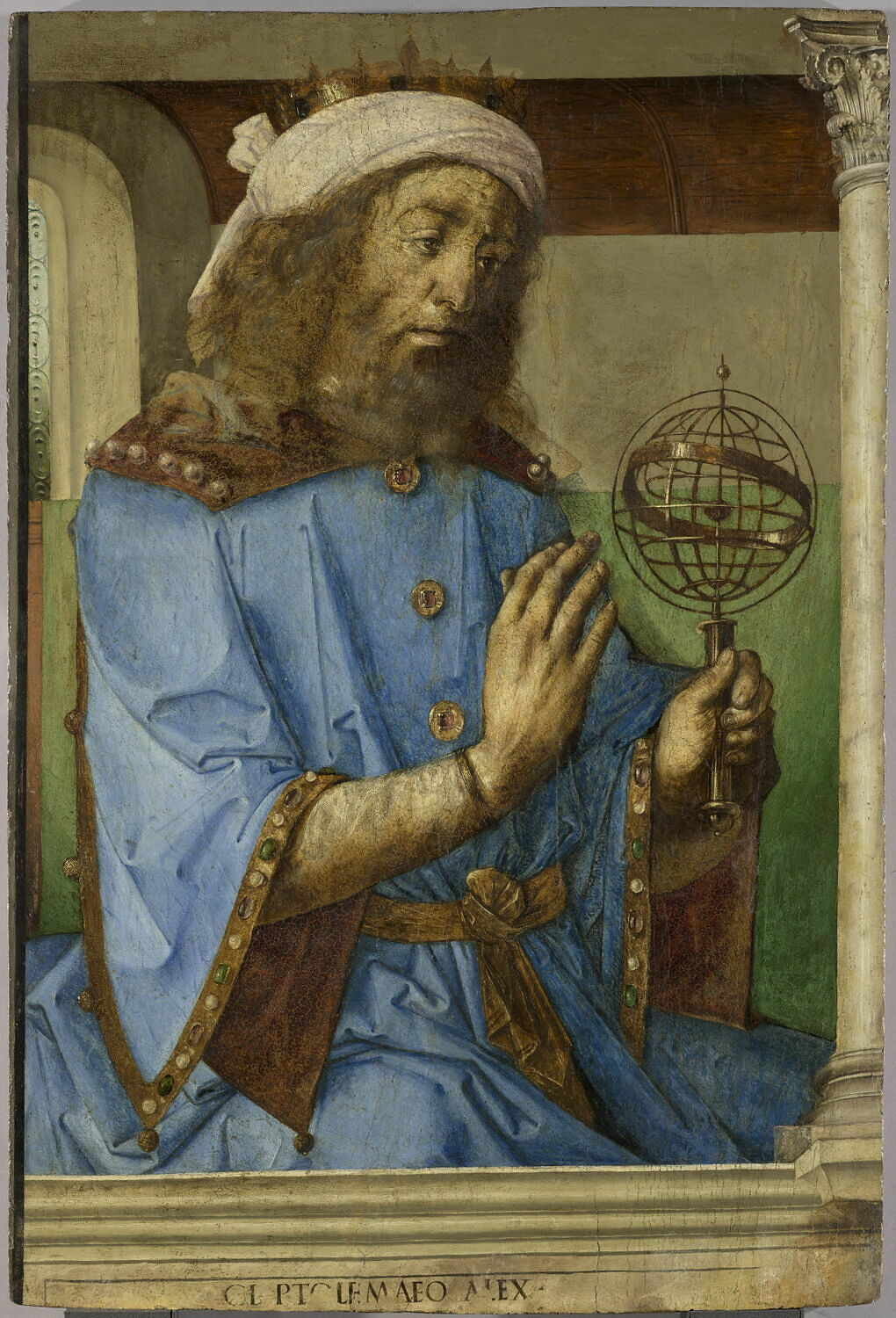
Ptolemy with an armillary sphere model, by Joos van Ghent and Pedro Berruguete, 1476, Louvre, Paris

In its simplest form, consisting of a ring fixed in the plane of the equator, the armilla is one of the most ancient of astronomical instruments. Slightly developed, it was crossed by another ring fixed in the plane of the meridian. The first was an equinoctial, the second a solstitial armilla. Shadows were used as indices of the sun's positions, in combinations with angular divisions. When several rings or circles were combined representing the great circles of the heavens, the instrument became an armillary sphere.

Armillary spheres were developed by the Hellenistic period and were used as teaching tools already in the 3rd century BC. In larger and more precise forms they were also used as observational instruments. However, the fully developed armillary sphere with nine circles perhaps did not exist until the mid-2nd century AD, during the Roman Empire. Eratosthenes most probably used a solstitial armilla for measuring the obliquity of the ecliptic. Hipparchus probably used an armillary sphere of four rings. The Greco-Roman geographer and astronomer Ptolemy (c. 100 – c. 170 AD) describes his instrument, the astrolabon, in his Almagest. It consisted of at least three rings, with a graduated circle inside of which another could slide, carrying two small tubes positioned opposite each other and supported by a vertical plumbline.

=== Medieval Middle East and Europe ===
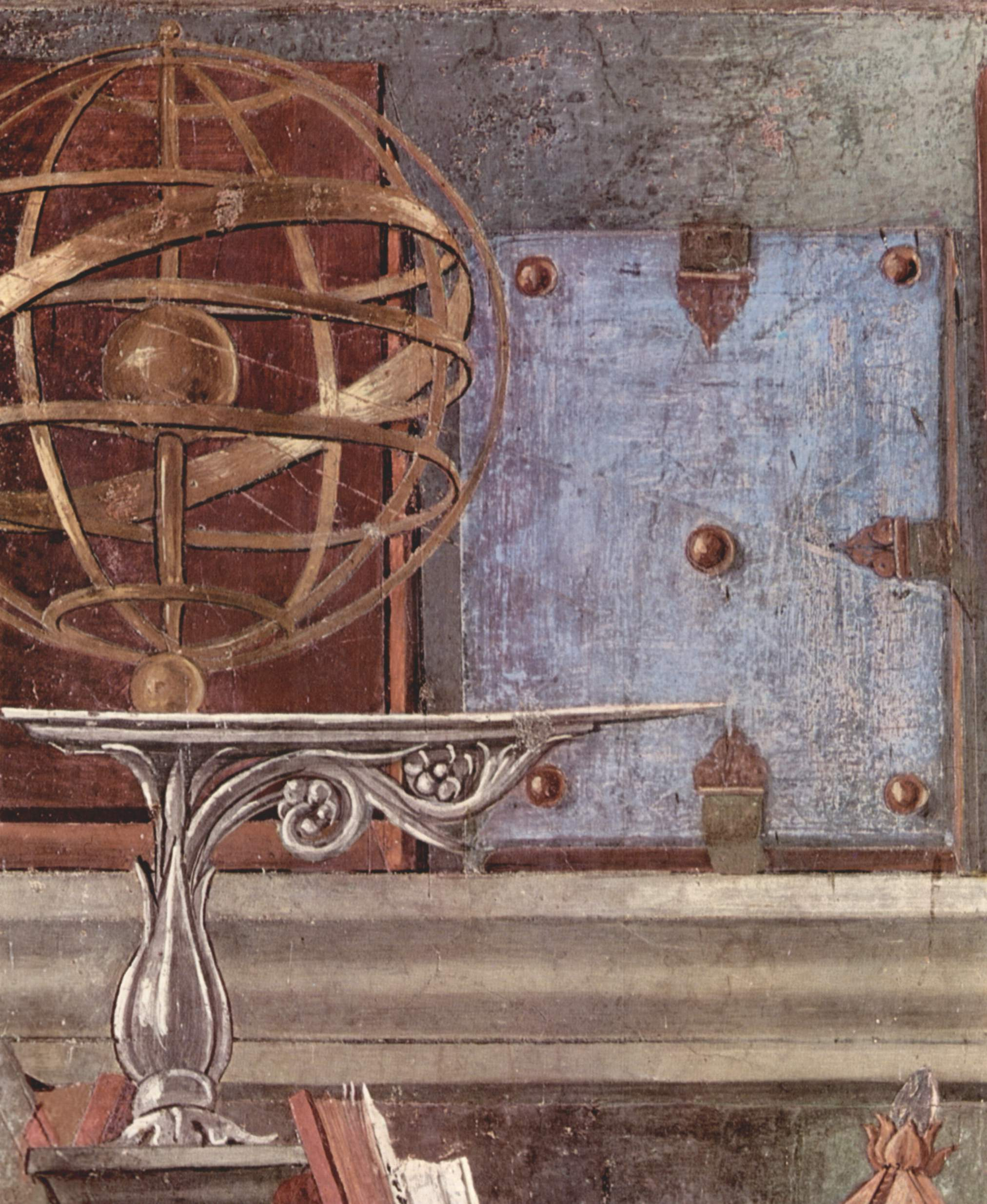
An armillary sphere in a painting by Florentine Italian artist Sandro Botticelli, c. 1480.

Islamic astronomy such as Ibrahim al-Fazari and Abbas Ibn Firnas continued to build and improve on armillary spheres. The spherical astrolabe, a variation of both the astrolabe and the armillary sphere, was likely invented during the Middle Ages in the Middle East. About 550 AD, Christian philosopher John Philoponus wrote a treatise on the astrolabe in Greek, which is the earliest extant treatise on the instrument. The earliest description of the spherical astrolabe dates back to the Persian astronomer Nayrizi (fl. 892–902). Pope Sylvester II applied the use of sighting tubes with his armillary sphere in order to fix the position of the pole star and record measurements for the tropics and equator, and used armillary spheres as a teaching device.

=== Korea ===
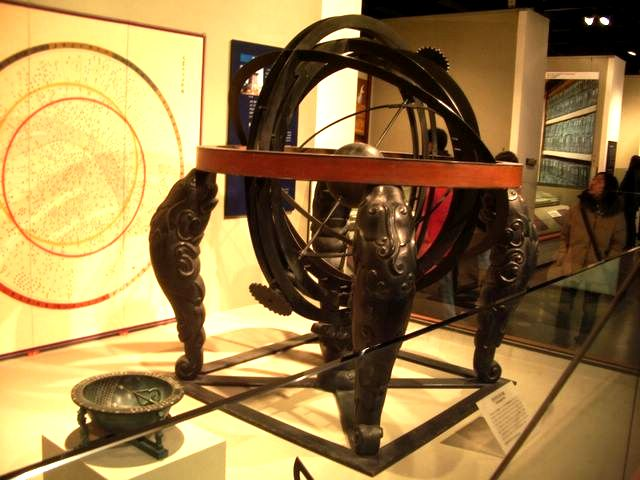
Korean celestial globe

Chinese ideas of astronomy and astronomical instruments were introduced to Korea, where further advancements were also made. Chang Yŏngsil, a Korean inventor, was ordered by King Sejong the Great of Joseon to build an armillary sphere. The sphere, built in 1433 was named Honcheonui (혼천의,渾天儀).

The Honcheonsigye, an armillary sphere activated by a working clock mechanism was built by the Korean astronomer Song Iyeong in 1669. It is the only remaining astronomical clock from the Joseon dynasty. The mechanism of the armillary sphere succeeded that of Sejong era's armillary sphere (Honŭi 渾儀, 1435) and celestial sphere (Honsang 渾象, 1435), and the Jade Clepsydra (Ongnu 玉漏, 1438)'s sun-carriage apparatus. Such mechanisms are similar to Ch'oe Yu-ji (崔攸之, 1603~1673)'s armillary sphere(1657). The structure of time going train and the mechanism of striking-release in the part of clock is influenced by the crown escapement which has been developed from 14th century, and is applied to gear system which had been improved until the middle of 17th century in Western-style clockwork. In particular, timing device of Song I-yŏng's Armillary Clock adopts the early 17th century pendulum clock system which could remarkably improve the accuracy of a clock.

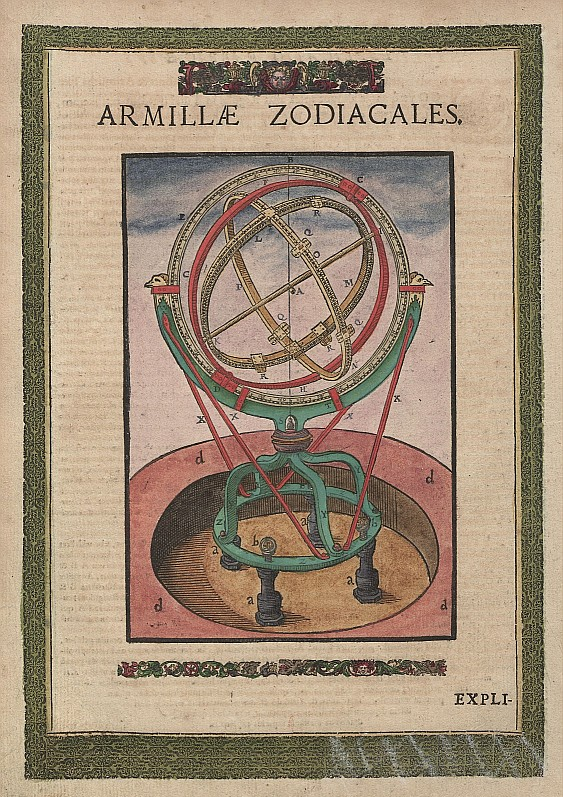
Tycho Brahe's zodiacal armillary sphere, from his Astronomiae Instauratae Mechanica (Wandesburg, 1598), p. 36.

=== Renaissance ===
Further advances in this instrument were made by Danish astronomer Tycho Brahe (1546–1601), who constructed three large armillary spheres which he used for highly precise measurements of the positions of the stars and planets. They were described in his Astronomiae Instauratae Mechanica.

Armillary spheres were among the first complex mechanical devices. Their development led to many improvements in techniques and design of all mechanical devices. Renaissance scientists and public figures often had their portraits painted showing them with one hand on an armillary sphere, which represented the zenith of wisdom and knowledge.

The armillary sphere survives as useful for teaching, and may be described as a skeleton celestial globe, the series of rings representing the great circles of the heavens, and revolving on an axis within a horizon. With the earth as center such a sphere is known as Ptolemaic; with the sun as center, as Copernican.

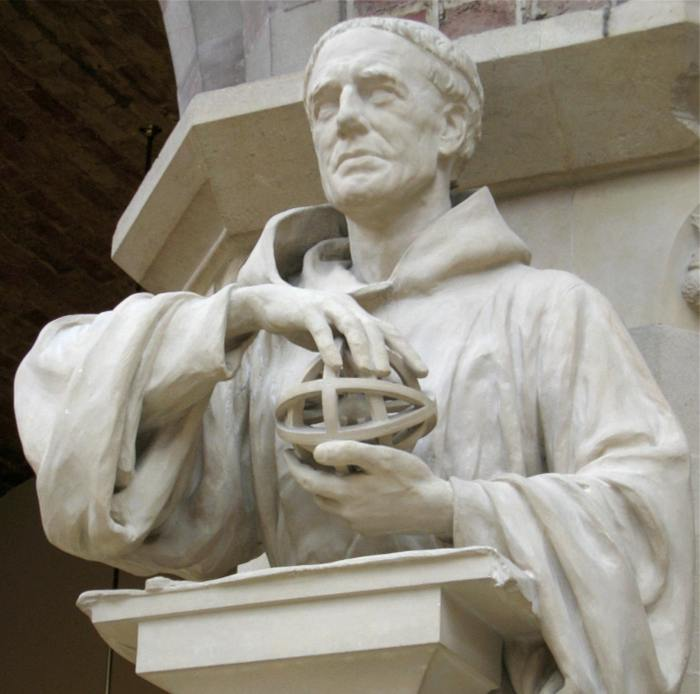
Sculpture of 13th-century English scientist Roger Bacon holding an armillary sphere, Oxford University Museum of Natural History

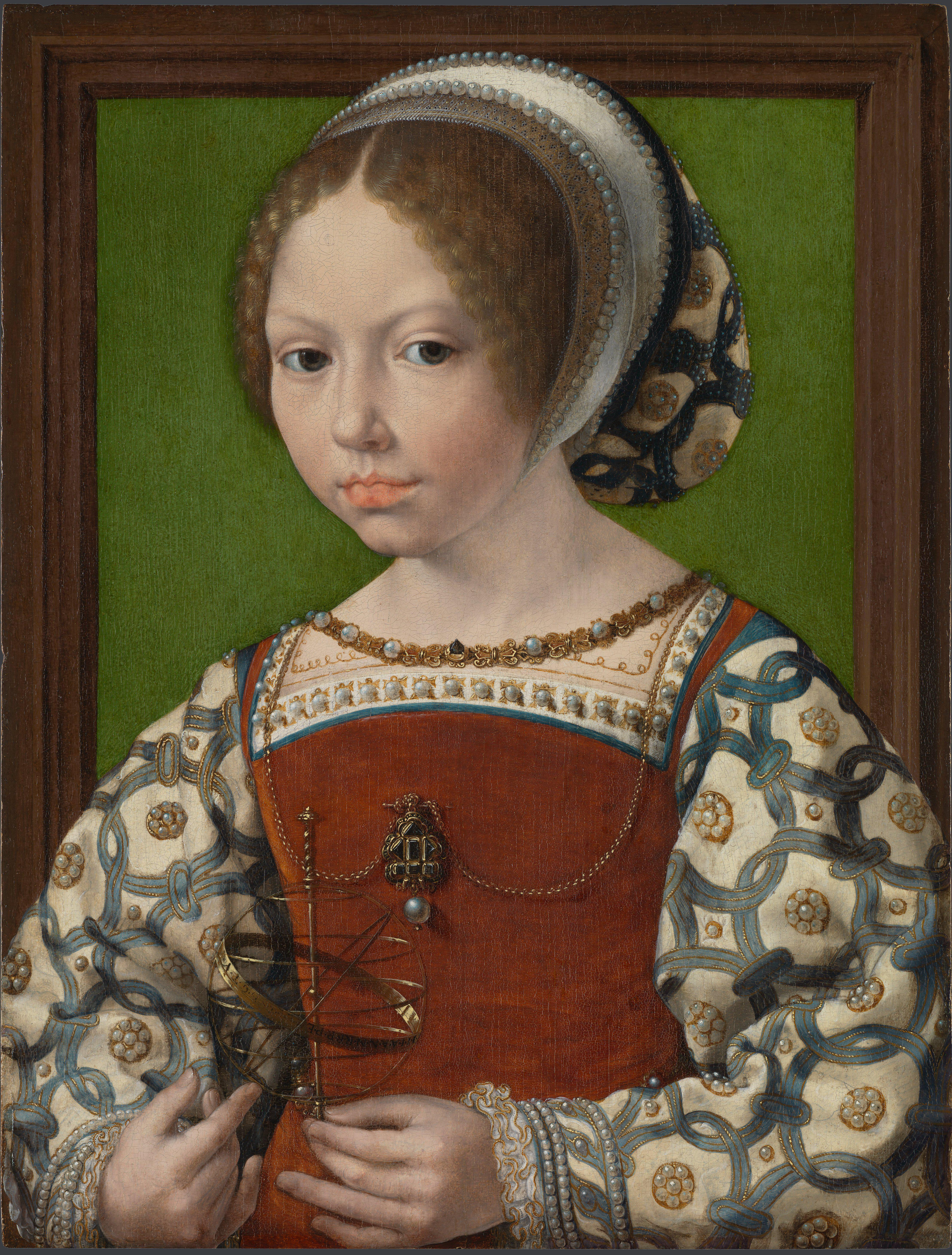
Young girl with an astronomical instrument, by Jan Gossaert, c. 1520-1540

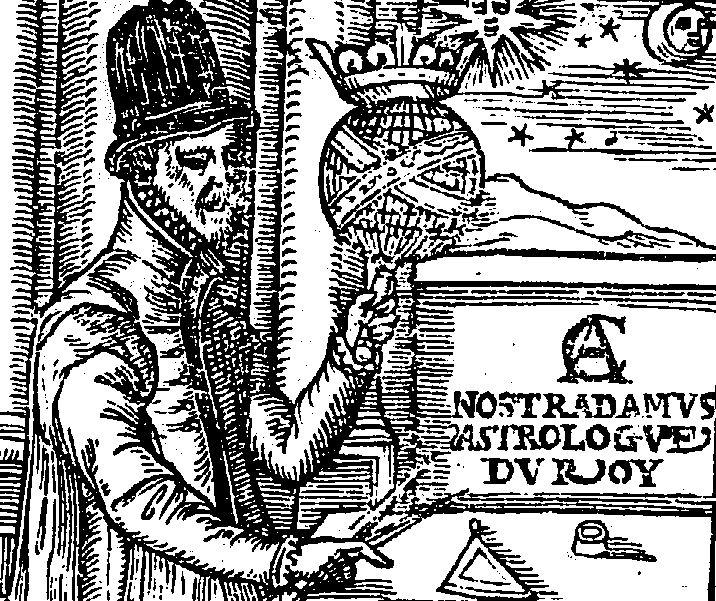
Portrait in the frontispiece of Antoine Crespin's Propheties par l'astrologue du treschrestien Roy de France et de Madame la Duchesse de Savoye, Lyon, France, 1572

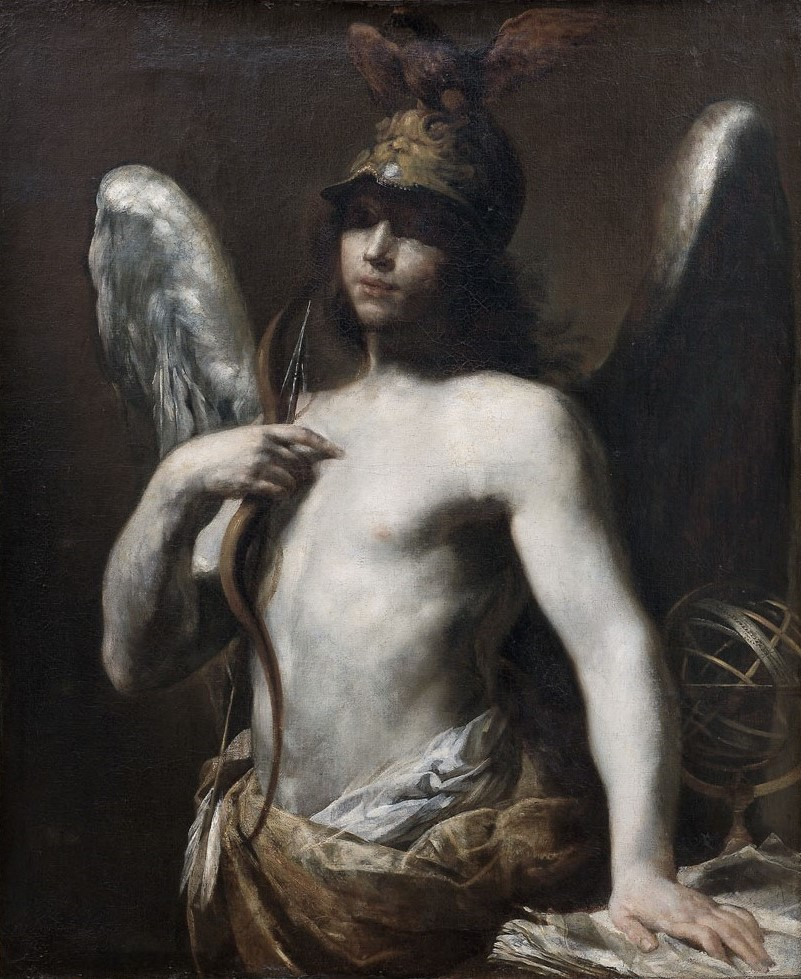
Allegory of Ingenuity by Giuseppe Crespi, c. 1695

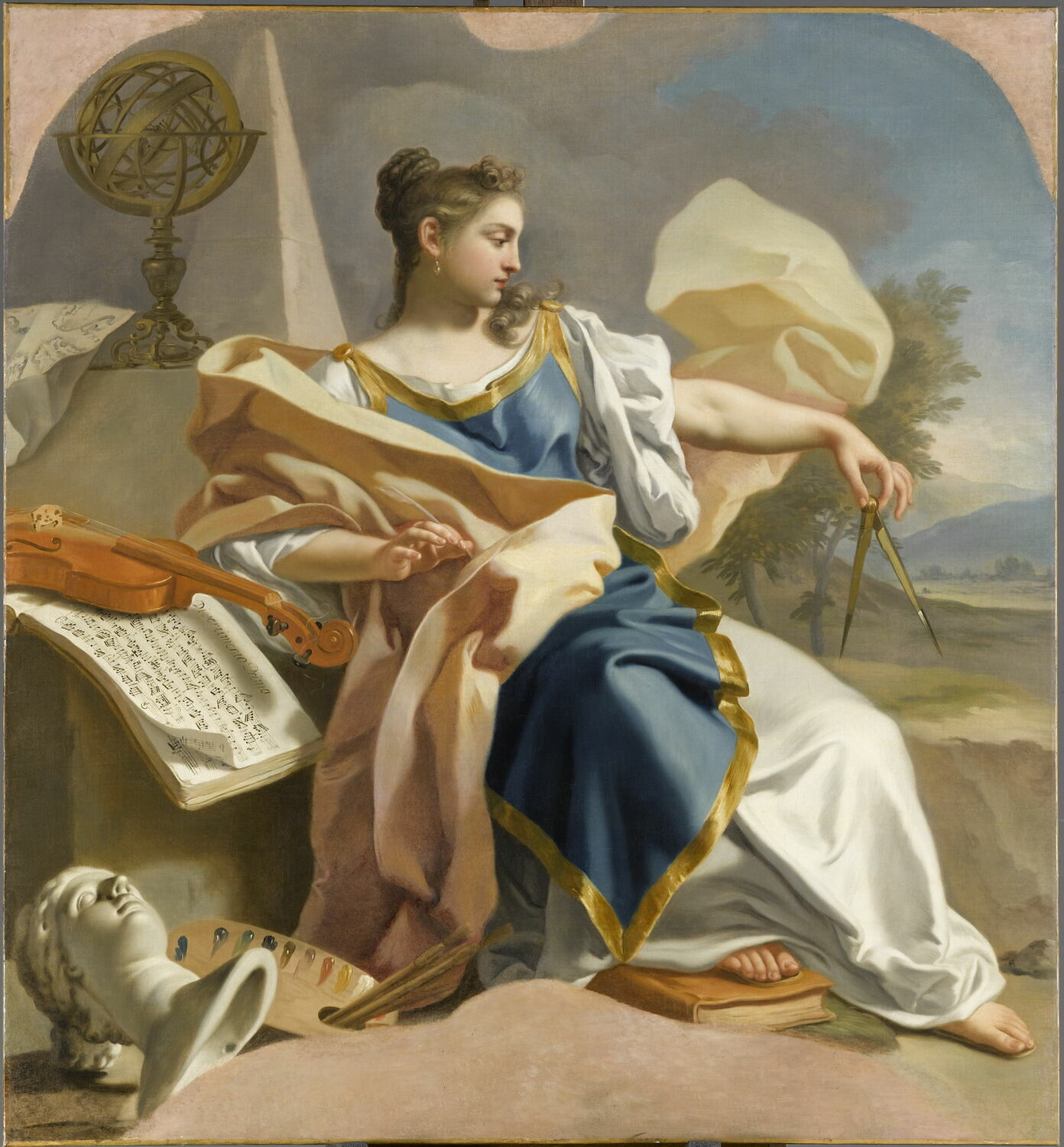
Allegory of the Arts, by Francesco de Mura, c. 1750

A representation of an armillary sphere is present in the modern flag of Portugal and has been a national symbol since the reign of Manuel I.

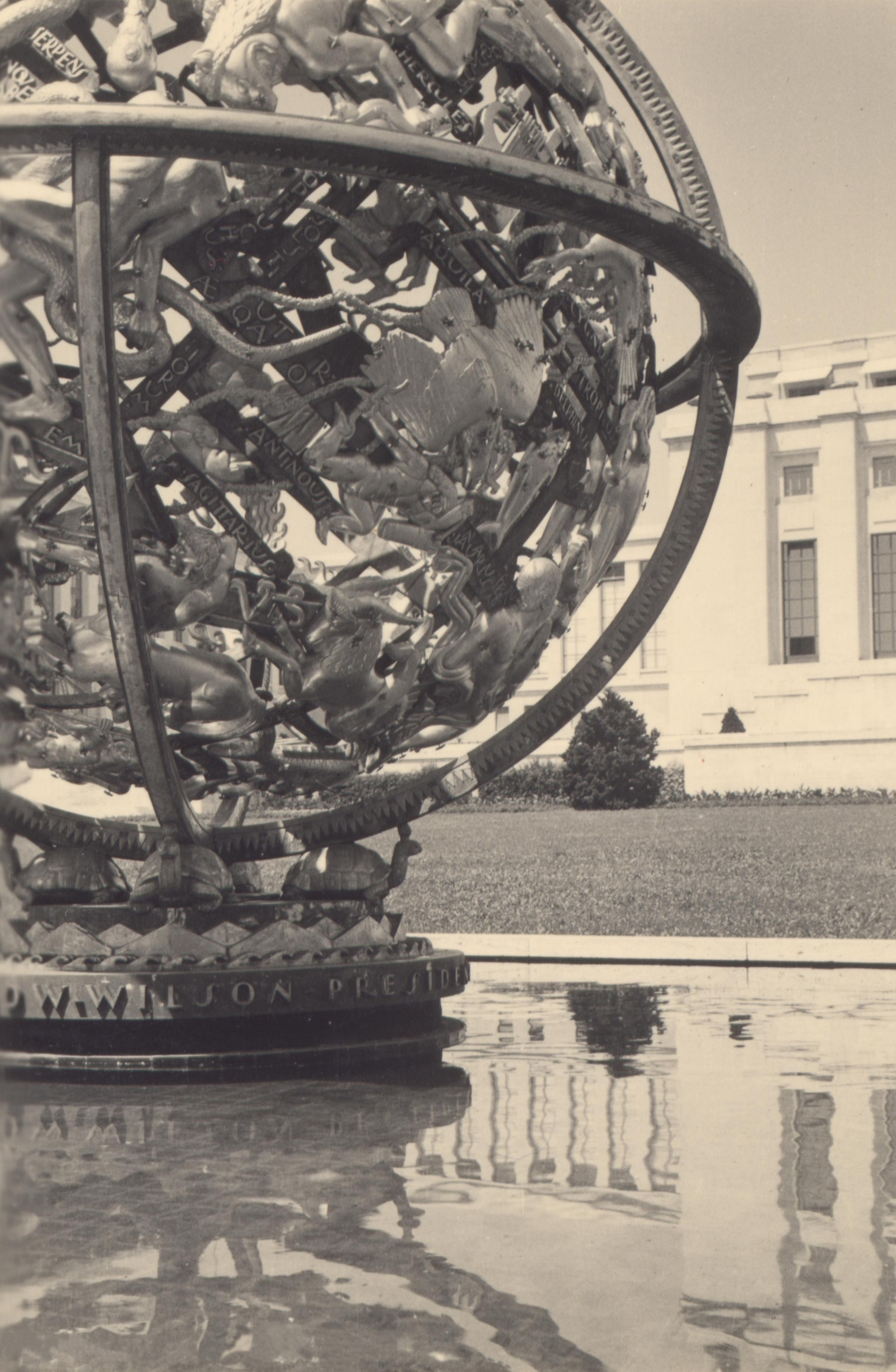
The Armillary sphere in the Palais des Nations, Geneva (Celestial Sphere Woodrow Wilson Memorial)

== Paralympic Games ==
An artwork-based model of an Armillary sphere has been used since the March 1, 2014 to light the Paralympic heritage flame at Stoke Mandeville Stadium, United Kingdom. The sphere includes a wheelchair that the user can rotate to spark the flame as part of a ceremony to celebrate the past, present and future of the Paralympic Movement in the UK. The Armillary Sphere was created by artist Jon Bausor and will be used for future Heritage Flame events. The flame in the first-ever ceremony was lit by London 2012 gold medallist Hannah Cockroft.

== Heraldry and vexillology ==
The flag of Portugal features a pronounced armillary sphere

The armillary sphere is commonly used in heraldry and vexillology, being mainly known as a symbol associated with Portugal, the Portuguese Empire and the Portuguese discoveries.

In the end of the 15th century, the armillary sphere became the personal heraldic badge of the future King Manuel I of Portugal, when he was still a Prince of Portugal. The intense use of this badge in documents, monuments, flags and other supports, during the reign of Manuel I, transformed the armillary sphere from a simple personal symbol to a national one that represented the Kingdom of Portugal and in particular its Overseas Empire. As a national symbol, the armillary sphere continued in use after the death of Manuel I.

In the 17th century, it became associated with the Portuguese dominion of Brazil. In 1815, when Brazil gained the status of kingdom united with that of Portugal, its coat of arms was formalized as a golden armillary sphere in a blue field. Representing Brazil, the armillary sphere became also present in the arms and the flag of the United Kingdom of Portugal, Brazil and the Algarves. When Brazil became independent as an empire in 1822, the armillary sphere continued to be present in its national arms and in its national flag. The celestial sphere of the present Flag of Brazil replaced the armillary sphere in 1889.

The armillary sphere was reintroduced in the national arms and in the national Flag of Portugal in 1911.

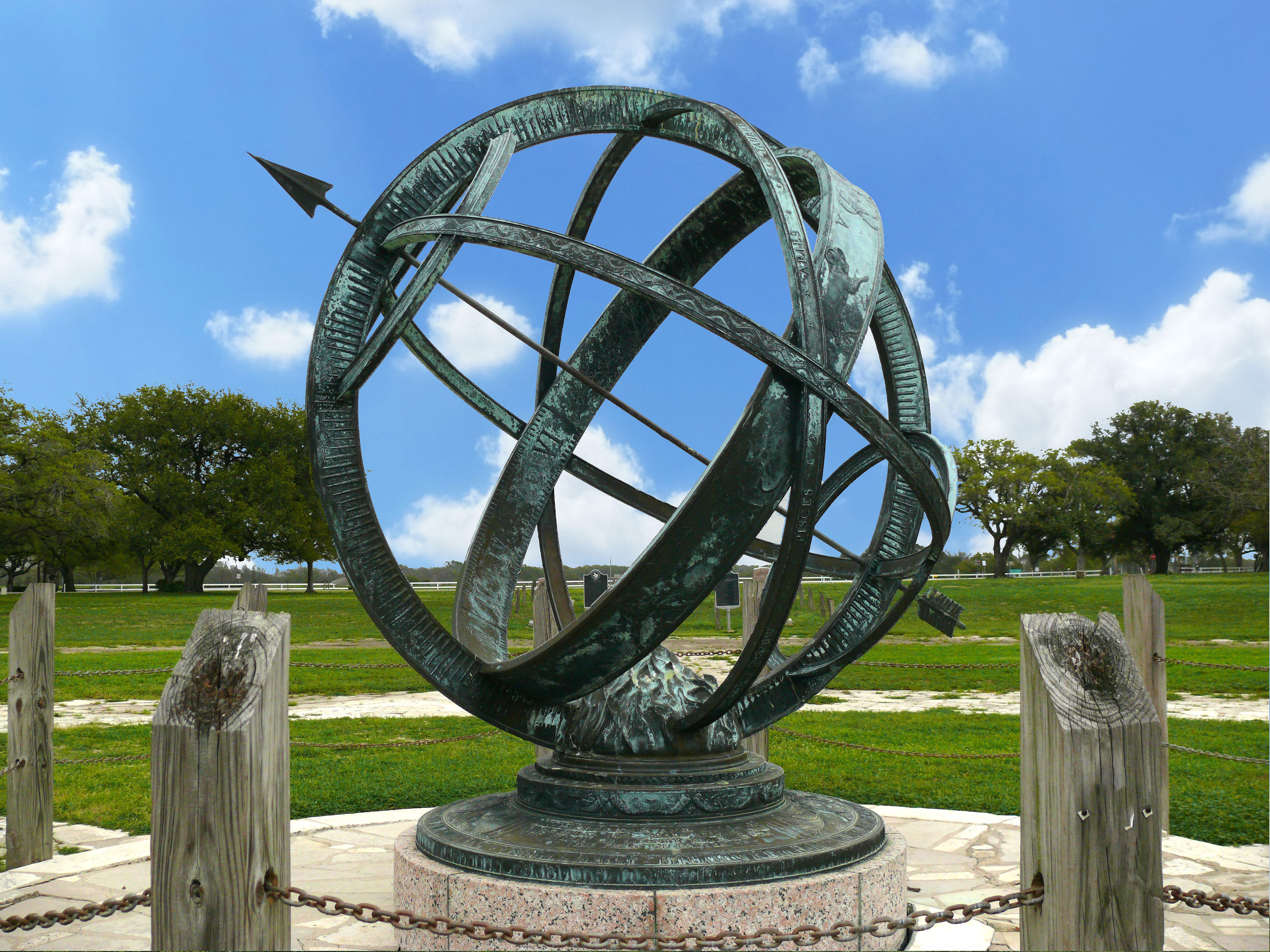
6' Armillary Sphere at the San Jacinto Battle Field in La Porte, Texas

== See also ==
- Antikythera mechanism – Ancient Greek analogue astronomical computer
- Celestial globe – Star charts arranged on a globe
- Atlas (statue) – Statue of Atlas at Rockefeller Center in Manhattan, New York, U.S.
- Chinese constellations – Celestial groupings used in Chinese astrology
- De sphaera mundi – Book by Sacrobosco, describes the late medieval (Ptolemaic) cosmos
- Chang Yŏngsil – Korean inventor (1390–1442)
- Orrery – Mechanical model of the Solar System, a free-standing Solar System model – Illustration of the relative positions of the Sun and planets
- Prague astronomical clock, also known as Prague Orloj – Medieval astronomical clock in the Czech Republic
- Santucci's Armillary Sphere – Ptolemaic armillary sphere – largest in the world
- Torquetum – Medieval astronomical instrument
- Noyes Armillary Sphere – Sculpture in Washington, D.C.
