= Museo Galileo =

Museum in Florence, Italy

Coordinates: 43°46′4″N 11°15′21″E

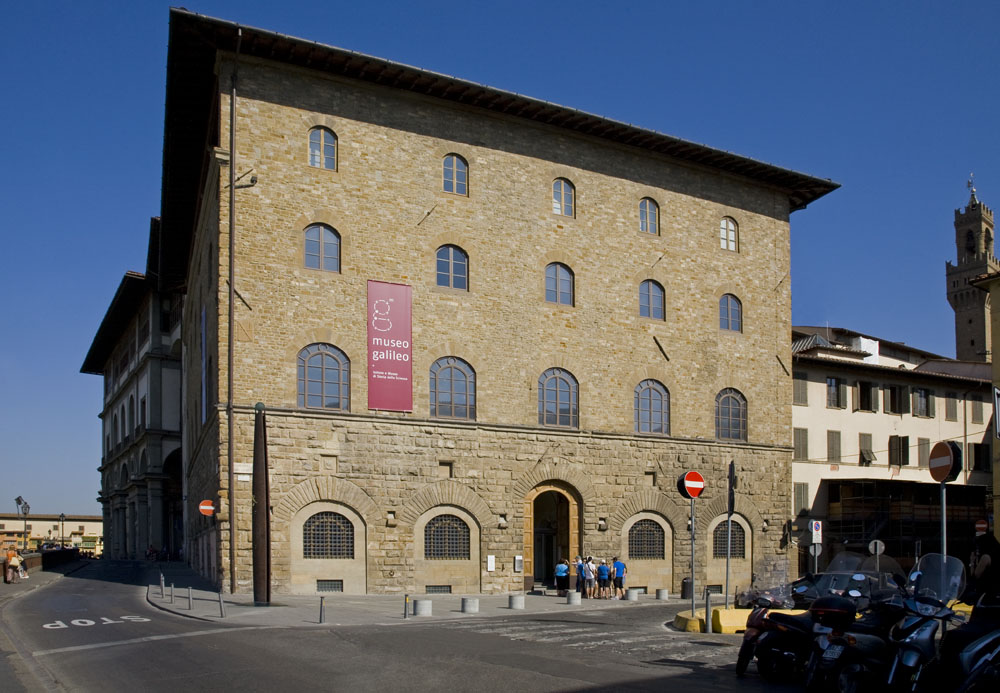
- Institute and Museum of the History of Science
- Location: Piazza dei Giudici 1, Florence, Italy

Museo Galileo (formerly Istituto e Museo di Storia della Scienza; Institute and Museum of the History of Science) is located in Florence, Italy, in Piazza dei Giudici, along the River Arno and close to the Uffizi Gallery. The museum, dedicated to astronomer and scientist Galileo Galilei, is housed in Palazzo Castellani, an 11th-century building which was then known as the Castello d'Altafronte.

Museo Galileo owns one of the world's major collection of scientific instruments, which bears evidence of the role that the Medici and Lorraine Grand Dukes attached to science and scientists.

The Museo di Storia della Scienza re-opened to the public with the new name Museo Galileo in June 2010, after a two-year closure due to redesigning and renovation work. Its name change celebrates the 400-year anniversary of Galileo's Sidereus Nuncius (The Starry Messenger), first published in March of 1610.

== The museum ==
The museum features the valuable scientific instruments from the Medici Collections which were first displayed in the Stanzino delle Matematiche (Mathematics Room) in the Uffizi Gallery. They were later moved to the Museo di Fisica e Storia Naturale (Museum of Physics and Natural History) founded by Grand Duke Peter Leopold in 1775. During the reign of the Lorraine Grand Dukes, new instruments were added to the scientific collections. In 1929, the First Italian Exhibition of the History of Science in Florence highlighted the importance of scientific collections within Italy's cultural heritage. As a consequence, in 1930 the University of Florence formed the Istituto di Storia della Scienza con annesso Museo (Institute of the History of Science and attached Museum). The institute was housed in Palazzo Castellani and was entrusted with the instrument collections of the Medici and Lorraine dynasties. The permanent exhibition is arranged by chronological and thematic paths.

== The museum directors ==
1930-1961 Andrea Corsini

1961-1981 Maria Luisa Righini Bonelli

1982-2021 Paolo Galluzzi

since 2021 Roberto Ferrari (Executive Director)

from July until December 2021 Marco Ciardi (Scientific Director)

since December 2021 Filippo Camerota (Scientific Director)

== The Medici Collection ==
The first floor's nine rooms are devoted to the Medici Collections, dating from the 15th century through the 18th century. The permanent exhibition includes all of Galileo's unique artifacts, among which are his only two extant telescopes and the framed objective lens from the telescope with which he discovered the Galilean moons of Jupiter; thermometers used by members of the Accademia del Cimento; and an extraordinary collection of terrestrial and celestial globes, including Santucci's Armillary Sphere, a giant armillary sphere designed and built by Antonio Santucci.

== The Lorraine Collection ==
The nine rooms on the second floor house instruments and experimental apparatus collected by the Lorraine dynasty (18th-19th century), which bear witness to the remarkable contribution of Tuscany and Italy to the progress of electricity, electromagnetism and chemistry. The exhibits include obstetrical wax models from the Santa Maria Nuova Hospital, Grand Duke Peter Leopold’s chemistry cabinet and the beautiful machines made in the workshop of the Museo di Fisica e Storia Naturale to illustrate the fundamental physical laws.

== Gallery ==
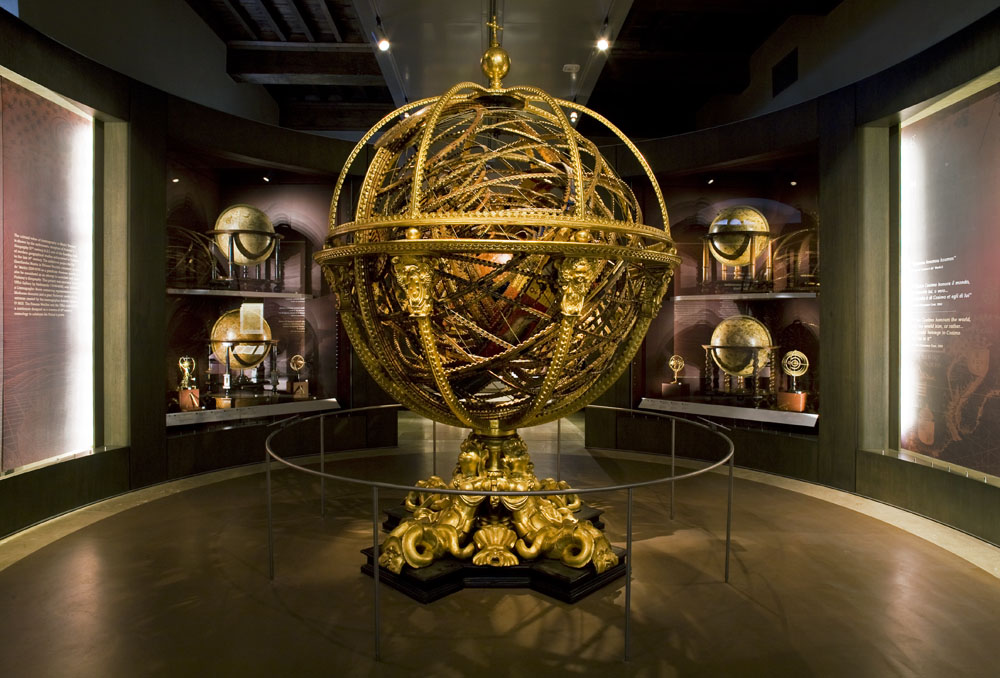
Santucci armillary sphere

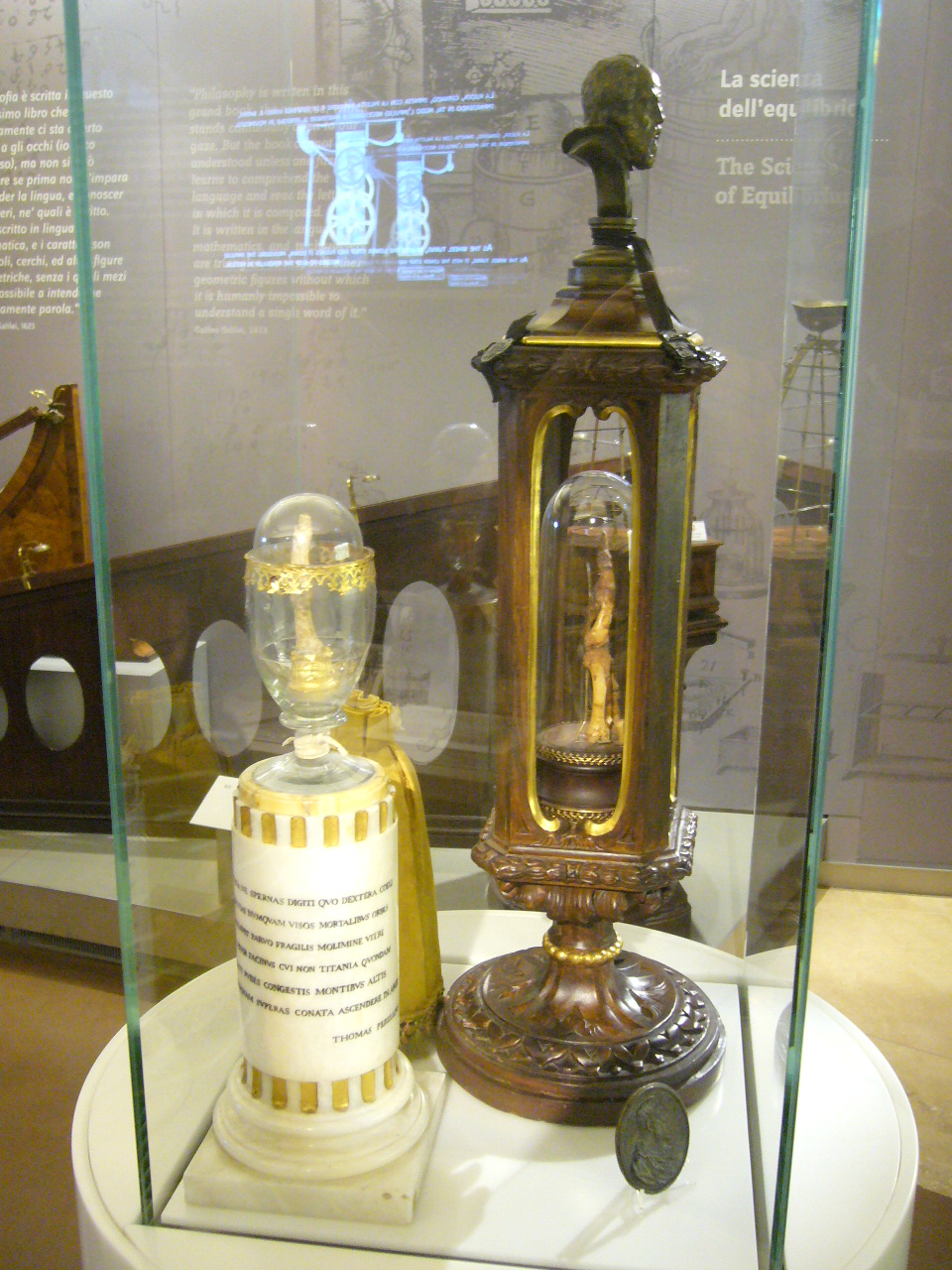
The middle finger of Galileo's right hand

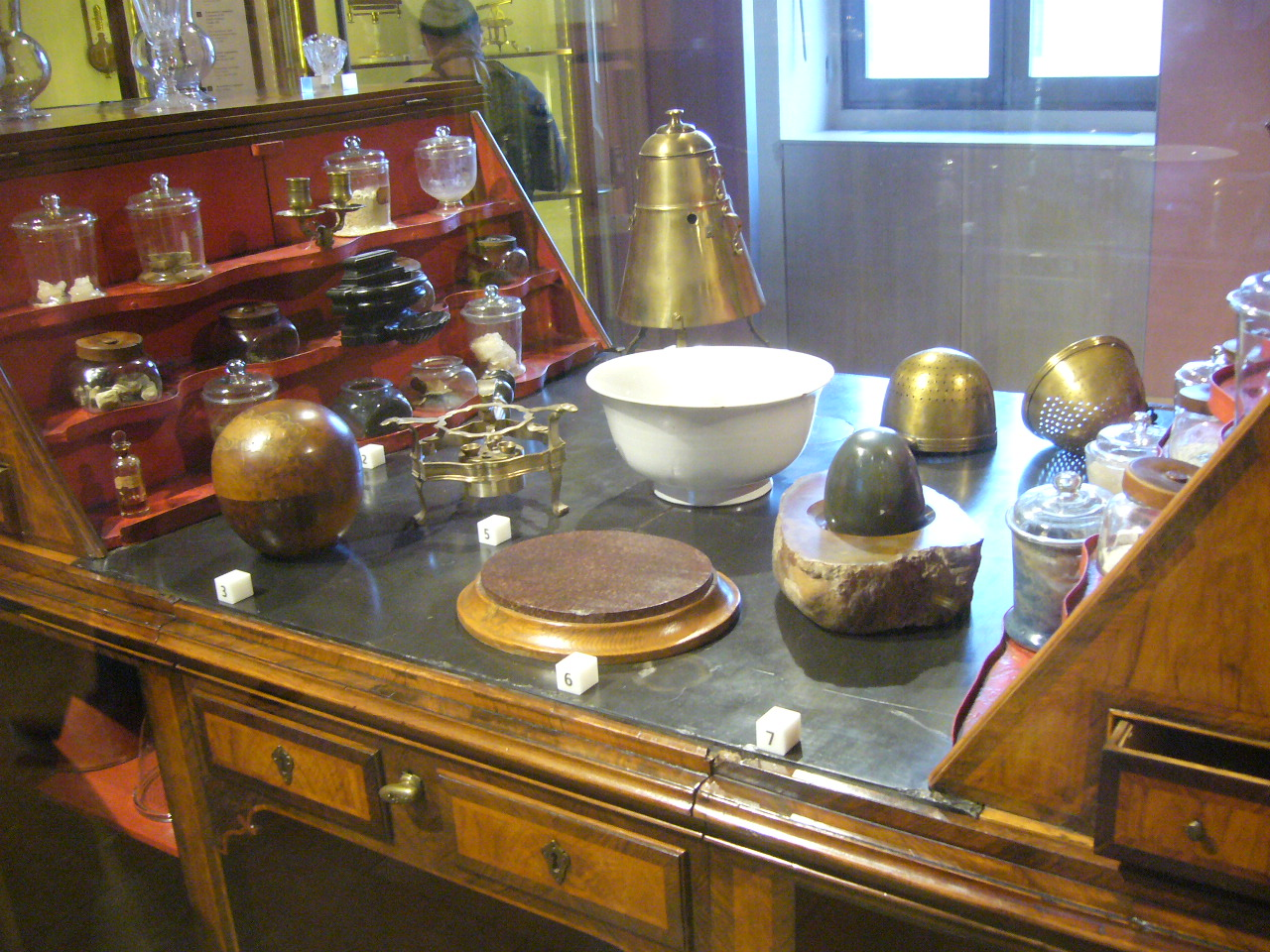
Chemistry cabinet

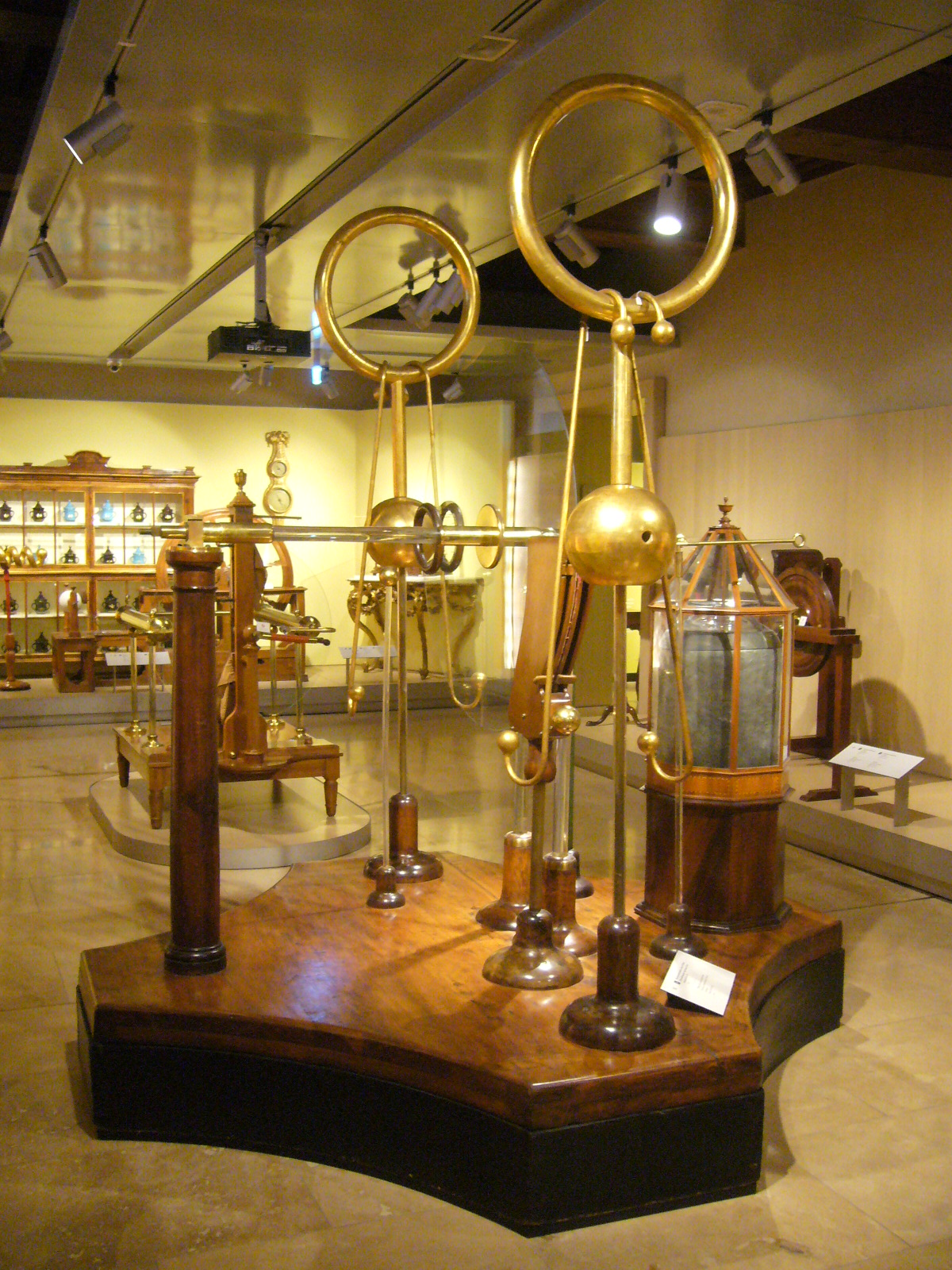
Winter plate electrical machine

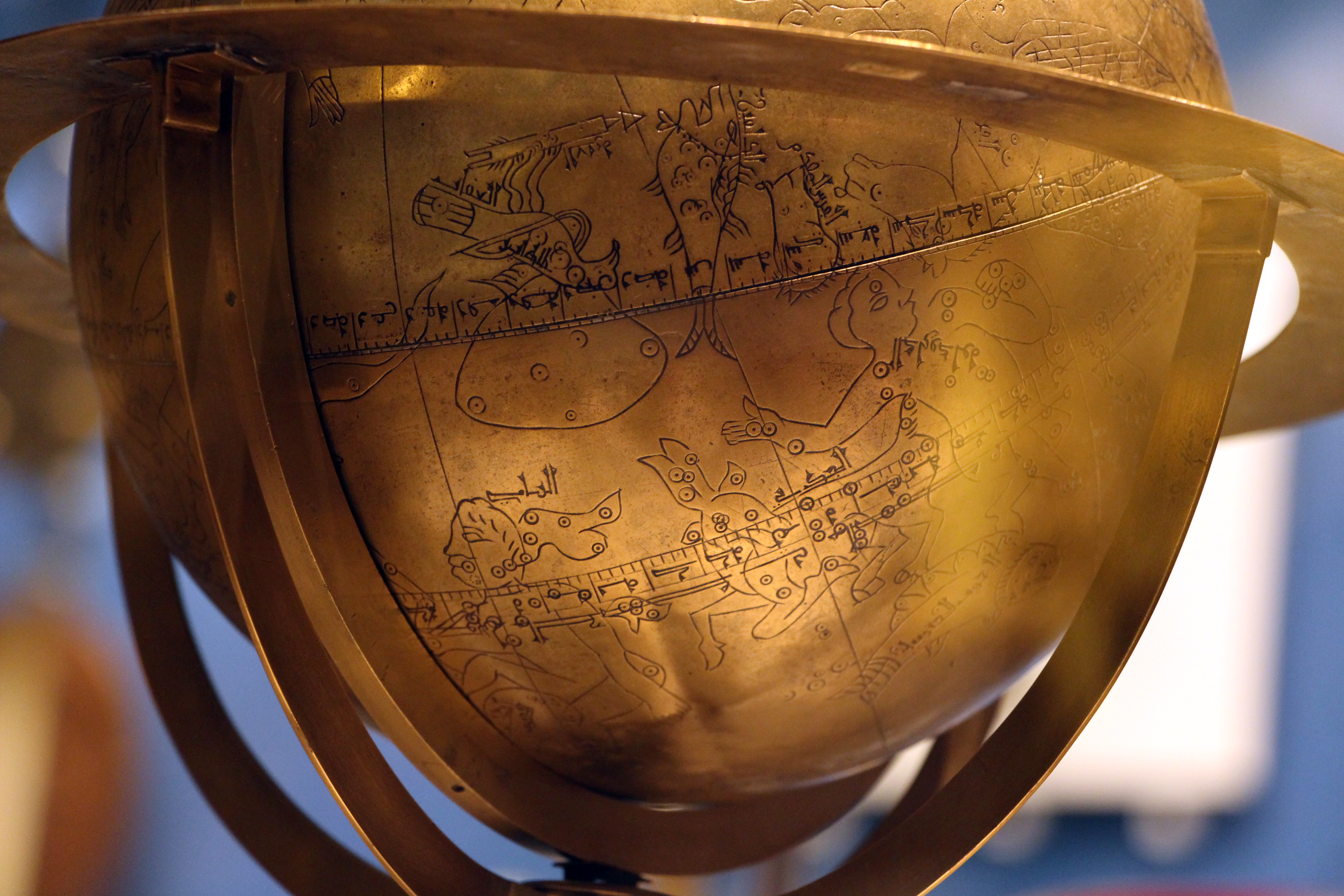
Arab celestial globe, possibly the oldest one in the world

== Research and documentation ==
Museo Galileo carries out research and documentation into the history of science and technology, as well as in the field of preservation and improvement to museum collections. The library's book collection and a number of online resources are available to scholars. The museum is a partner with important institutions, the Royal Swedish Academy of Sciences, the Nobel Foundation, the Max Planck Society’s institutes and Harvard University, and co-sponsors several research projects. It also organizes and takes part in many conferences on scientific museology and the history of science and technology.

== Temporary exhibitions ==
Museo Galileo has been enhancing and promoting the dissemination of scientific culture for many years. In order to meet this commitment effectively, it promotes exhibitions on the history of science and the relationship between science, technology and art. Among the most important exhibitions in Italy and the world: Renaissance Engineers: From Brunelleschi to Leonardo da Vinci; The Mind of Leonardo: The Universal Genius at Work; The Medici and Science; Galileo’s Telescope: The Instrument that Changes the World; Galileo: Images of the Universe from Antiquity to the Telescope; Vinum Nostrum: Art, Science and Myths of Wine in Ancient Mediterranean Cultures; Archimedes: The Art and Science of Invention, and the most recent (2019-2020) Water as Microscope of Nature: Leonardo da Vinci's Codex Leicester, Leonardo and His Books: The Library of the Universal Genius, Leonardo da Vinci and Perpetual Motion, The Art of Building a Masterpiece: Trajan Column.

== Publications ==
Museo Galileo publishes historical scientific works and two journals, which are Nuncius: Journal of the Material and Visual History of Science, and Galilaeana, devoted to research about the figure, work and scientific findings of Galileo Galilei. The Nuncius Library series publishes the results of original research into the history of science and technology as well as editions of sources, while the Galilaeana Library series publishes critical essays, document collections and text editions related to Galileo and to the cultural scenario of the early modern period. Also the Archives of Italian Scientists’ Correspondence and the Italian Science Library series. In addition, the museum publishes catalogues relevant to its collections and the temporary exhibitions it promotes.

== The library ==
The library, which has been a part of the institute since its foundation, was completely remodelled in 2002, when it was moved to the third floor of Palazzo Castellani. The new architectural display was awarded the “Bibliocom Biblioteche in vetrina” prize. The library houses about 150,000 works concerning the history of science. The antique book collection consists of nearly 5,000 works. It includes the Medici-Lorraine Collection, comprising scientific books mostly about physics and mathematics, gathered by Tuscan dynasties over five centuries. The library is also home to several 18th- to 20th-century archival collections and a photo archive related to the history of the museum's collections, ancient instruments and places of scientific interest. The contemporary collection includes books in Italian and the major European languages and has an annual growth of about 1,800 new acquisitions. All of the library's material can be searched in the online catalogue. Among the library's activities are the compiling of bibliographies –notably the International Galilaean Bibliography– and the cataloguing of documents relevant to the history of science, even those not in the library's possession. In 2004, a Digital Library was created to preserve and publish digital collections of historical scientific interest.

== The Multimedia Lab ==
Aware of the growing importance of information and communication technologies, Museo Galileo started its own Multimedia Lab in 1991. The Lab produces offline and online interactive applications related to the dissemination and documentation of both permanent collections and temporary exhibitions. It also creates digital archives for historical scientific research.

== See also ==
- Galileo Galilei
- Paolo Galluzzi

== Bibliography ==
- Camerota, Filippo, ed. (2010). Museo Galileo: Masterpieces of Science. Firenze: Giunti. ISBN 9788809748828.
- Camerota F., ed. (2010). Museo Galileo: Masterpieces of Science. Giunti. ISBN 9788809748828.
- F. Camerota, ed. (2010). Museo Galileo: A Guide to the Treasures of the Collection. Firenze: Giunti. ISBN 9788809748835.
- F. Camerota, ed. (2012). Galileo and the Measurement of Time: Interactive Area,. Firenze: Giunti. ISBN 9788809776067.
- Today’s discovery is... Galileo and the Science of his Time. Milano: Touring Junior. 2013. ISBN 9788836564507.
- F. Camerota, ed. (2012). Displaying Scientific Instruments: From the Medici Wardrobe to the Museo Galileo. Milano: Goppion. ISBN 9788888714172.
