= Santucci's Armillary Sphere =

Ptolemaic armillary sphere

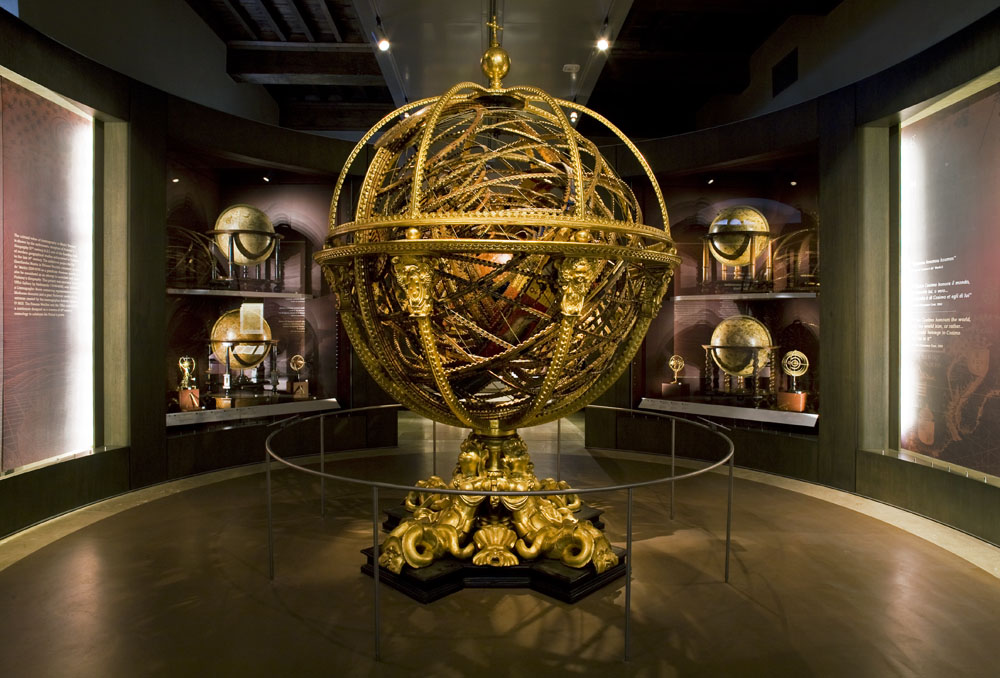
Hall III of Museo Galileo

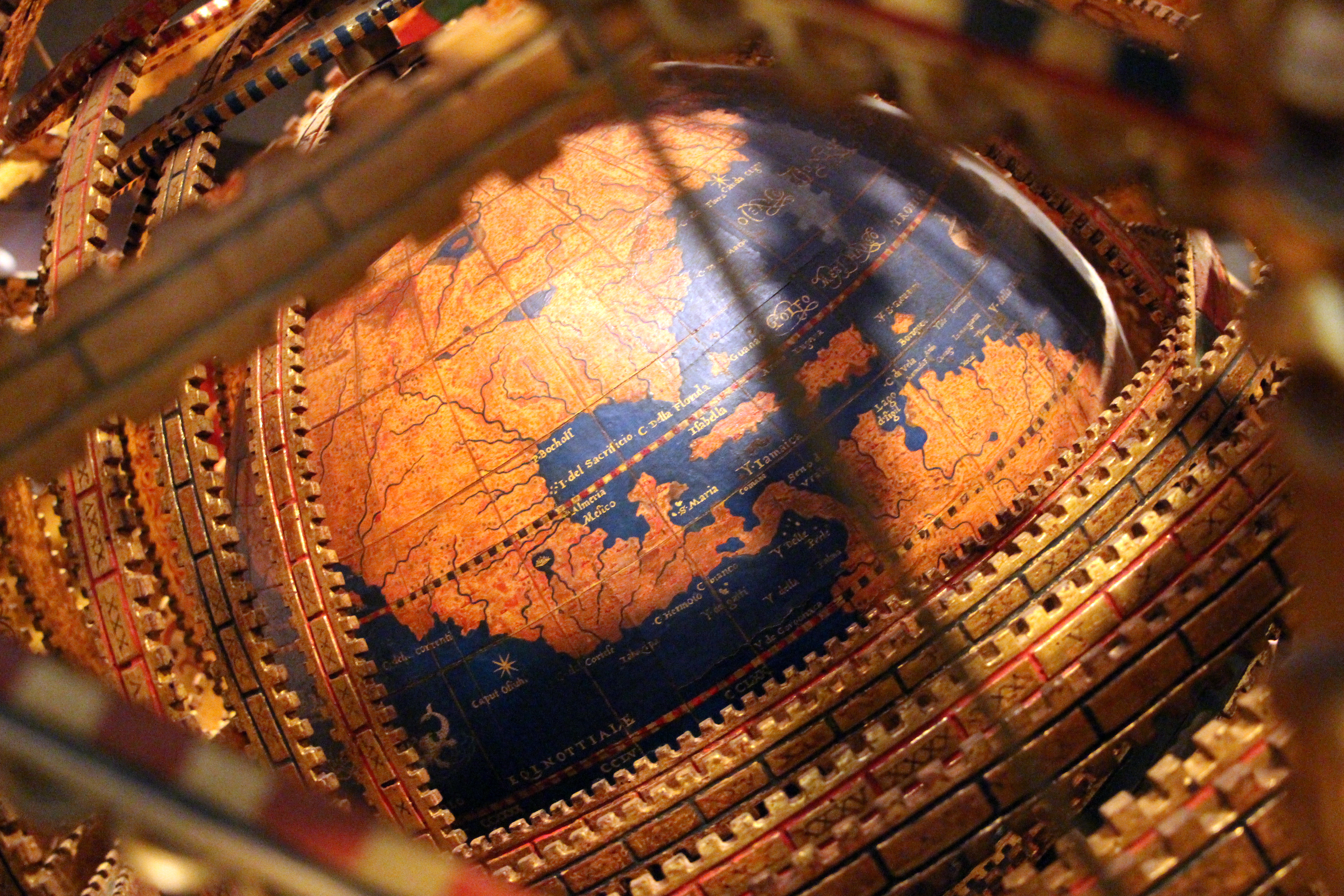
Detail of Santucci's armillary sphere

Santucci's armillary sphere is a Ptolemaic armillary sphere at the Museo Galileo in Florence, the largest existing in the world.

Begun on March 4, 1588, and completed on May 6, 1593, this large armillary sphere was built under the supervision of Antonio Santucci at the request of Ferdinand I de' Medici. The sphere represents the "universal machine" of the world according to the concepts developed by Aristotle and perfected by Ptolemy. The terrestrial globe is placed at the center, and it also displays territories that were still relatively little known at the time: notably, it includes both Lake Albert and Lake Victoria in central Africa, which were apparently forgotten again until the explorations of Samuel Baker and John Hanning Speke over 250 years later.

The device was restored in the 19th century but is now incomplete and some of its parts are mismatched. The wooden parts of the sphere are elaborately painted and covered with fine gold leaf. The sphere rests on a stand with four sirens.

This model is similar to a smaller one built by Santucci in 1582 for King Philip II of Spain, now in the Escorial Library.
