= Colure =

Principal meridians of the celestial sphere

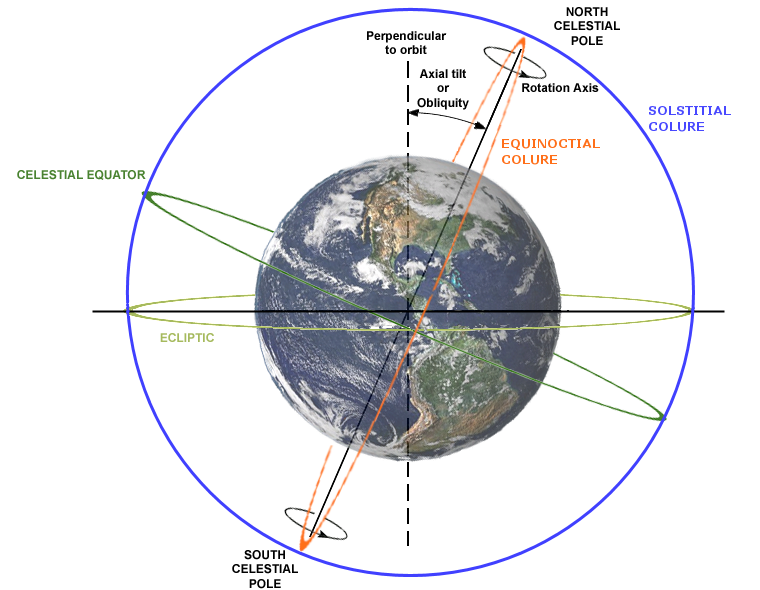
Orange = equinoctial colure Blue = solstitial colure

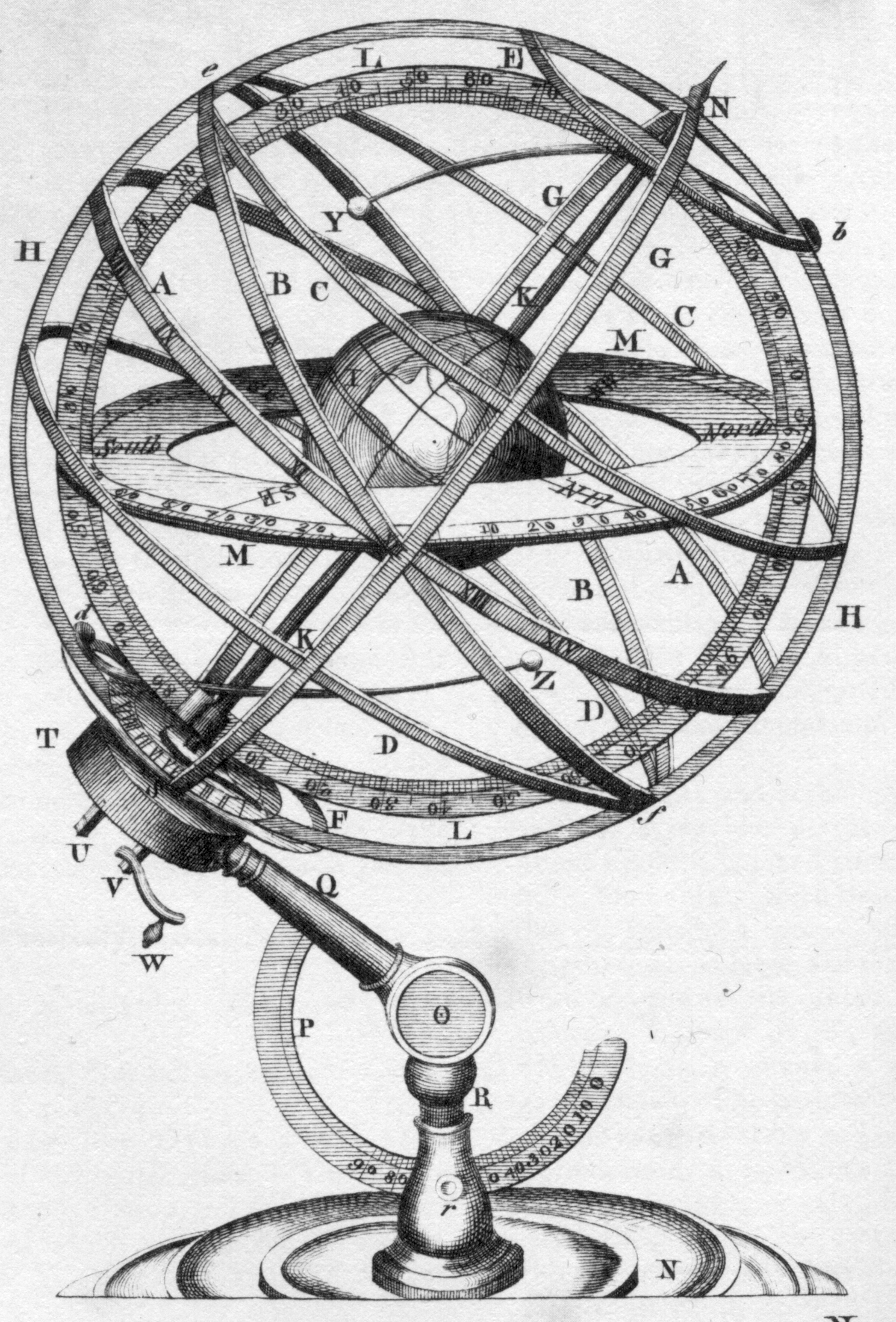
G = equinoctial colure H = solstitial colure

Colure, in astronomy, is either of the two principal meridians of the celestial sphere. The term is now rarely used and may be considered obsolete.

== Equinoctial colure ==
The equinoctial colure is the meridian or great circle of the celestial sphere which passes through the celestial poles and the two equinoxes: the first point of Aries and the first point of Libra. It is the great circle consisting of all points on the celestial sphere with Right Ascension equal to 0 hours or 12 hours (equivalent to RA 0° / 180°).

The equinoctial colure passes through the following constellations:

- Ursa Minor
- Camelopardalis
- Draco
- Ursa Major
- Coma Berenices
- Virgo
- Corvus
- Hydra
- Centaurus
- Crux
- Musca
- Chamaeleon
- Octans
- Tucana
- Phoenix
- Sculptor
- Cetus
- Pisces
- Pegasus
- Andromeda
- Cassiopeia
- Cepheus

== Solstitial colure ==
The solstitial colure is the meridian or great circle of the celestial sphere which passes through the poles and the two solstices: the first point of Cancer and the first point of Capricorn. It is the great circle consisting of all points on the celestial sphere with Right Ascension equal to 6 hours or 18 hours (equivalent to RA 90° / 270°).

The solstitial colure passes through the following constellations:

- Ursa Minor
- Cepheus
- Camelopardalis
- Auriga
- Taurus
- Orion
- Monoceros
- Lepus
- Columba
- Pictor
- Dorado
- Mensa
- Octans
- Apus
- Pavo
- Ara
- Corona Australis
- Sagittarius
- Serpens
- Ophiuchus
- Hercules
- Draco

== See also ==
- Celestial coordinate system
- Ecliptic
- Celestial sphere
- Right ascension
- Equinox
- Solstice
