= List of Chinese inventions =

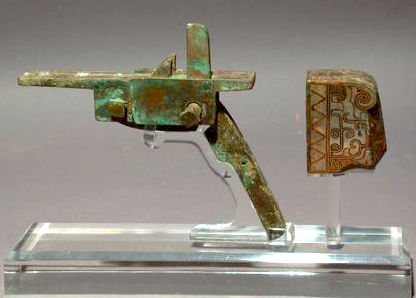
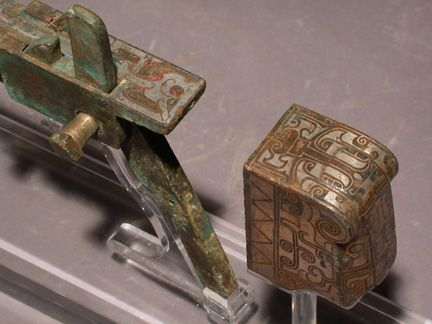
A bronze Chinese crossbow trigger mechanism with a butt plate (the wooden components have since eroded and disappeared), inlaid with silver, from either the late Warring States period (403–256 BC) or the early Han dynasty (202 BC – AD 220)

China has been the source of many innovations, scientific discoveries and inventions. This includes the Four Great Inventions: papermaking, the compass, gunpowder, and early printing (both woodblock and movable type). The list below contains these and other inventions in ancient and modern China attested by archaeological or historical evidence, including prehistoric inventions of Neolithic and early Bronze Age China.

The historical region now known as China experienced a history involving Steel, hydraulics and mathematics applied to horology, metallurgy, astronomy, agriculture, engineering, music theory, craftsmanship, naval architecture and warfare. Use of the plow during the Neolithic period Longshan culture (c. 3000 – c. 2000 BC) allowed for high agricultural production yields and rise of Chinese civilization during the Shang dynasty (c. 1600 – c. 1050 BC). Later inventions such as the multiple-tube seed drill and the heavy moldboard iron plow enabled China to sustain a much larger population through improvements in agricultural output.

By the Warring States period (403–221 BC), inhabitants of Ancient China had advanced metallurgic technology, including the blast furnace and cupola furnace, and the finery forge and puddling process were known by the Han dynasty (202 BC – 220 AD). A sophisticated economic system in imperial China gave birth to inventions such as paper money during the Song dynasty (960–1279). The invention of gunpowder in the mid 9th century during the Tang dynasty led to an array of inventions such as the fire lance, land mine, naval mine, hand cannon, exploding cannonball, multistage rocket and rocket bomb with aerodynamic wings and explosive payloads. Differential gears were utilized in the south-pointing chariot for terrestrial navigation by the 3rd century during the Three Kingdoms. With the navigational aid of the 11th century compass and ability to steer at sea with the 1st century sternpost rudder, premodern Chinese sailors sailed as far as East Africa. In water-powered clockworks, the Chinese had used the escapement mechanism since the 8th century, and the endless power-transmitting chain drive in the 11th century. They also made large mechanical puppet theaters driven by waterwheels and carriage wheels and wine-serving automatons driven by paddle wheel boats.

For the purposes of this list, inventions are regarded as technological firsts developed in China, and as such it does not include foreign technologies which the Chinese acquired through contact, such as the windmill from the Middle East or the telescope from early modern Europe. It also does not include technologies developed elsewhere and later invented separately by the Chinese, such as the odometer, water wheel, and chain pump. Scientific, mathematical or natural discoveries made by the Chinese, changes in minor concepts of design or style and artistic innovations do not appear on the list.

== Four Great Inventions ==
The following is a list of the Four Great Inventions—as designated by Joseph Needham (1900–1995), a British scientist, historian and sinologist known for his research on the history of Chinese science and technology.

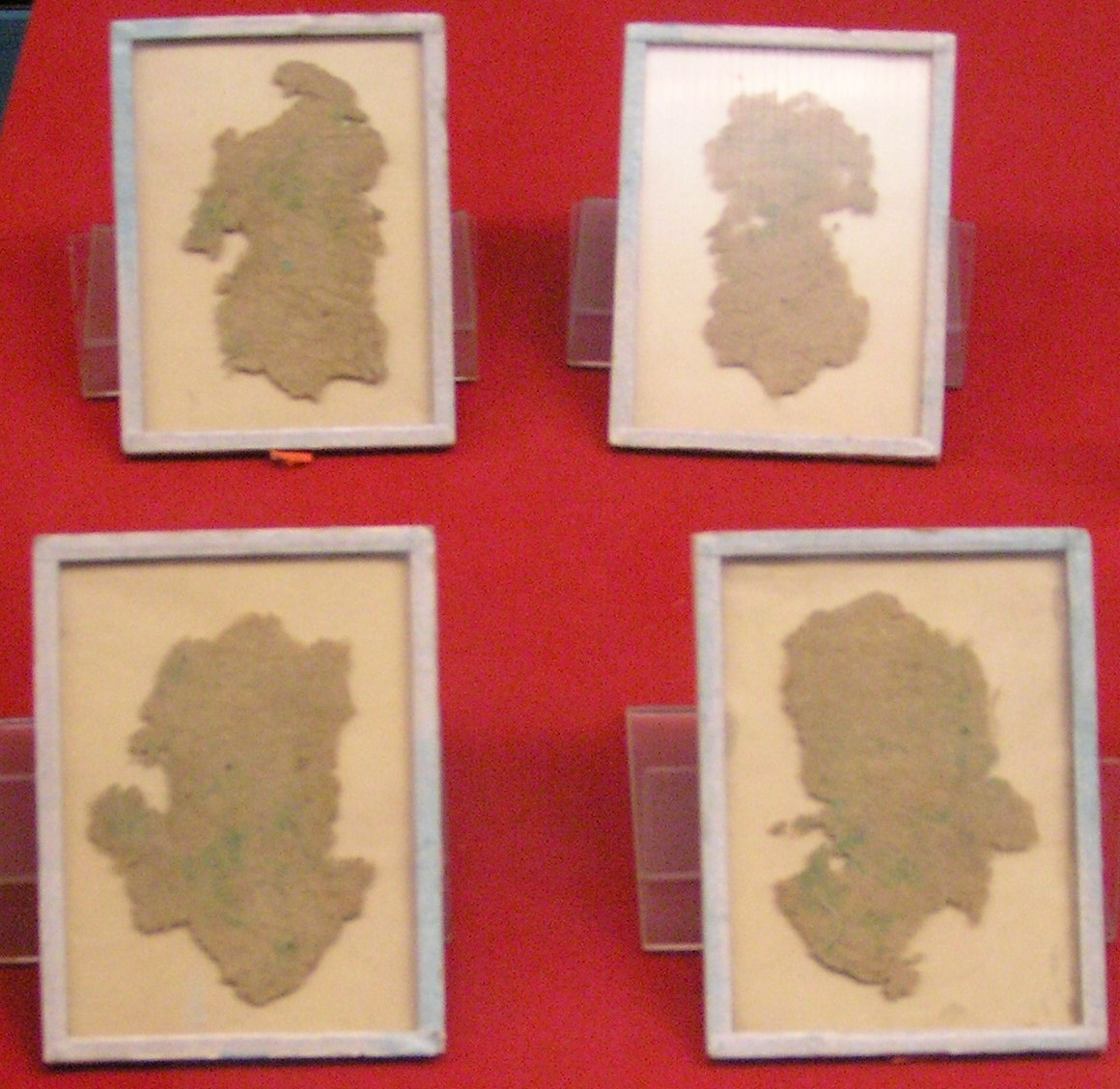
Fragments of hemp wrapping paper dated to the reign of Emperor Wu of Han (141–87 BC)

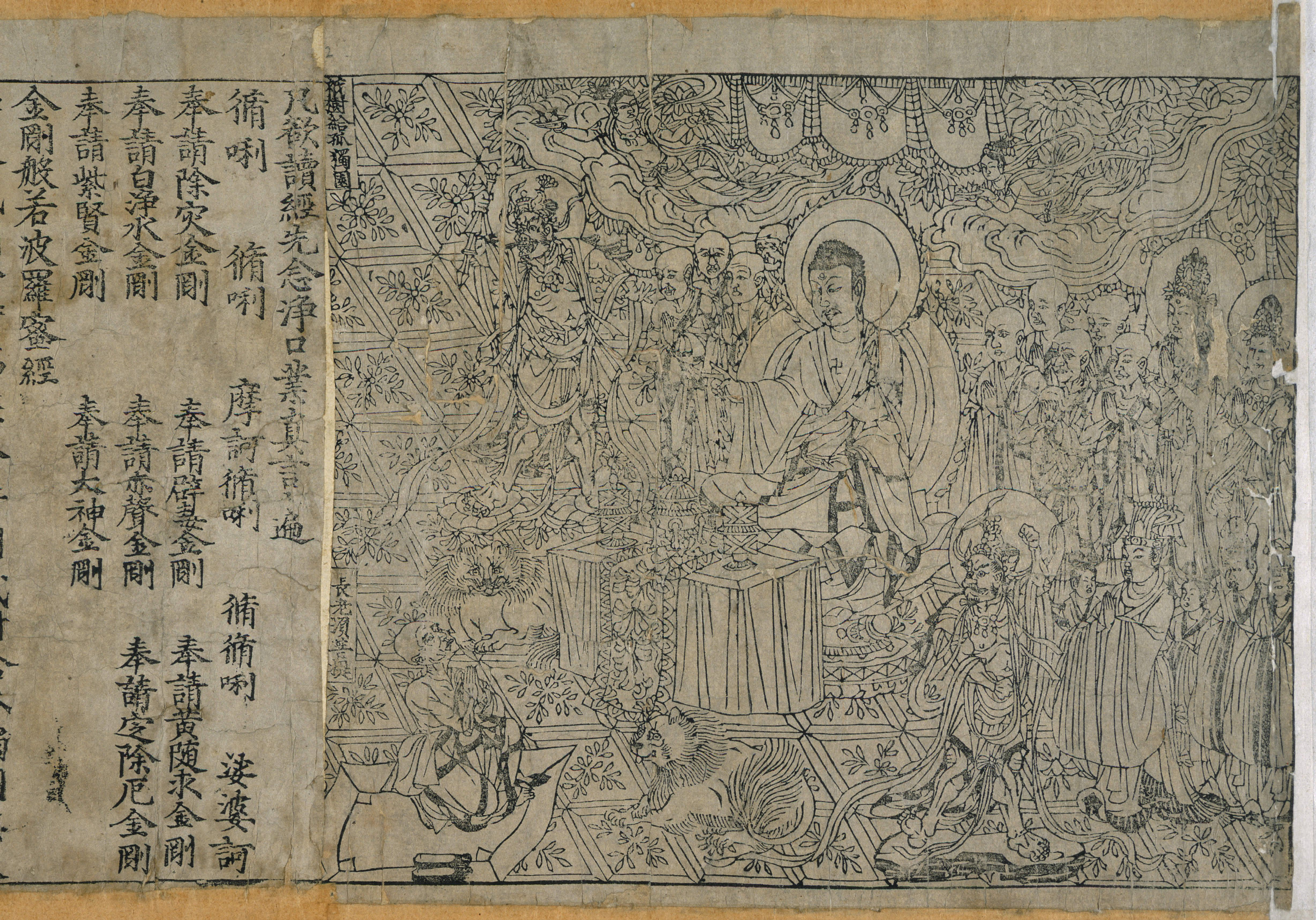
The Diamond Sutra, the oldest printed book, published in AD 868, during the Tang dynasty (618–907)

=== Paper ===
Paper: Although it is recorded that the Han dynasty (202 BC – AD 220) court eunuch Cai Lun (50–121 AD) invented the pulp papermaking process and established the use of new materials used in making paper, ancient padding and wrapping paper artifacts dating from the 2nd century BC have been found in China, the oldest example of pulp papermaking being a map from Fangmatan, Tianshui; by the 3rd century, paper as a writing medium was in widespread use, replacing traditional but more expensive writing mediums such as strips of bamboo rolled into threaded scrolls, strips of silk, wet clay tablets hardened later in a furnace, and wooden tablets. The earliest known piece of paper with writing on it was discovered in the ruins of a Chinese watchtower at Tsakhortei, Alxa League, where Han dynasty troops had deserted their position in AD 110, after a Xiongnu attack. In the papermaking process established by Cai in 105, a boiled mixture of mulberry tree bark, hemp, old linens and fish nets created a pulp that was pounded into paste and stirred with water; a wooden frame sieve with a mat of sewn reeds was then dunked into the mixture, which was then shaken and then dried into sheets of paper that were bleached by exposure to sunlight; K. S. Tom says this process was gradually improved through leaching, polishing and glazing to produce a smooth, strong paper.

=== Printing ===
Woodblock printing: The earliest specimen of woodblock printing is a single-sheet dharani sutra in Sanskrit that was printed on hemp paper between 650 and 670 AD; it was unearthed in 1974 from a Tang tomb near Xi'an. A Korean miniature dharani Buddhist sutra discovered in 1966, bearing extinct Chinese writing characters used only during the reign of China's only self-ruling empress, Wu Zetian (r. 690–705), is dated no earlier than 704 and preserved in a Silla Korean temple stupa built in 751. The first printed periodical, the Kaiyuan Za Bao was made available in 713. However, the earliest known book printed at regular size is the Diamond Sutra, made during the Tang dynasty (618–907), a 5.18 m (17.0 ft) long scroll which bears the date 868. Needham and Tsien Tsuen-hsuin write that the cutting and printing techniques used for the delicate calligraphy of the Diamond Sutra book are much more advanced and refined than the miniature dharani sutra printed earlier.

Yuan dynasty banknote with its printing wood plate from 1287 AD.

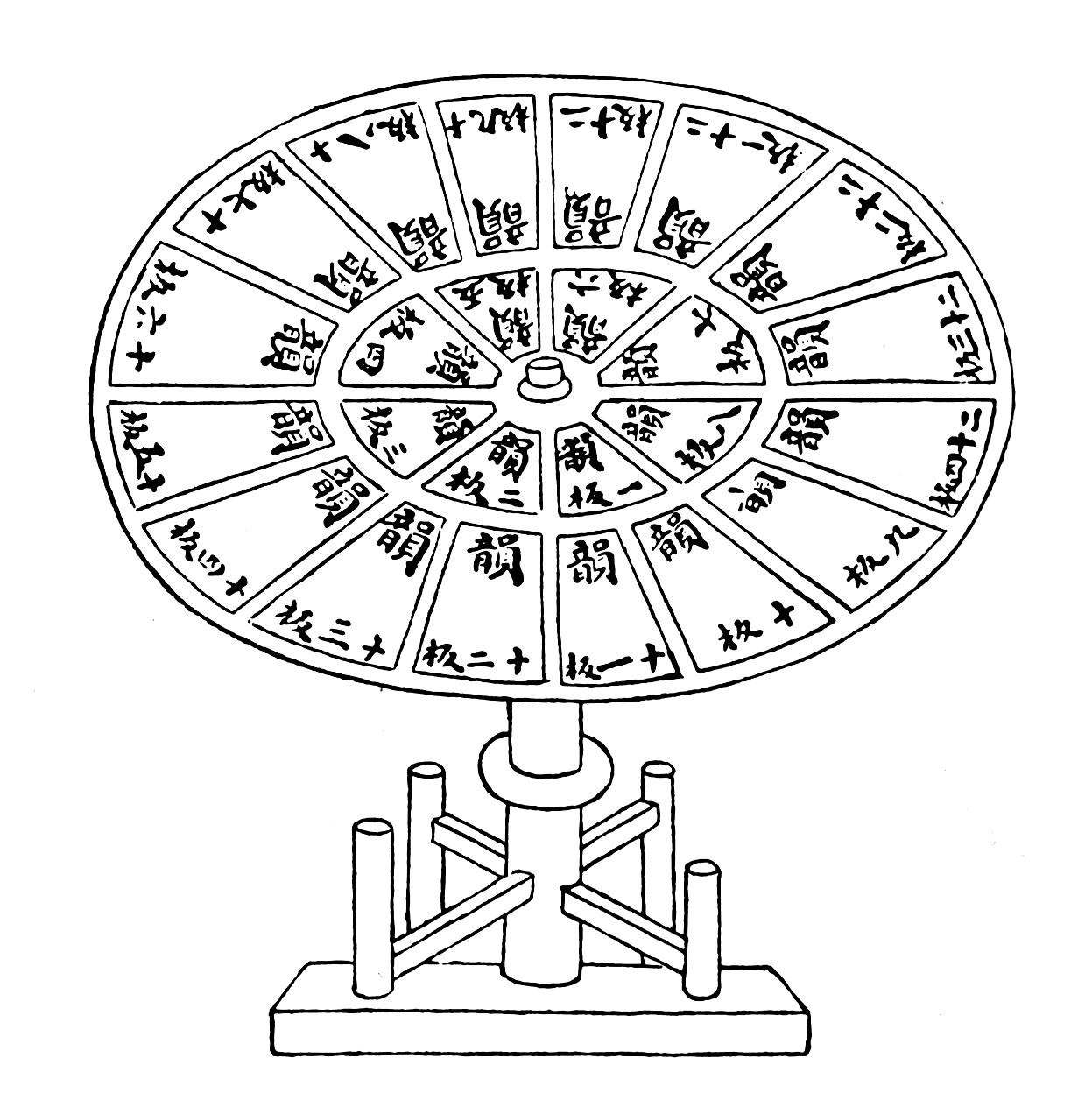
An illustration published in Wang Zhen's (fl. 1290–1333) book of AD 1313 showing movable type characters arranged by rhyme scheme in round table compartments

Movable type: The polymath scientist and official Shen Kuo (1031–1095 AD) of the Song dynasty (960–1279) was the first to describe the process of movable type printing in his Dream Pool Essays of 1088. He attributed the innovation of reusable fired clay characters to a little-known artisan named Bi Sheng (990–1051). Bi had experimented with wooden type characters, but their use was not perfected until 1297 to 1298 with the model of the official Wang Zhen (fl. 1290–1333), who also arranged written characters by rhyme scheme on the surface of round table compartments. It was not until 1490 with the printed works of Hua Sui (1439–1513) that the Chinese perfected metal movable type characters, namely bronze. The scholar Xu Zhiding of Tai'an, Shandong developed vitreous enamel movable type printing in 1718.

=== Gunpowder ===
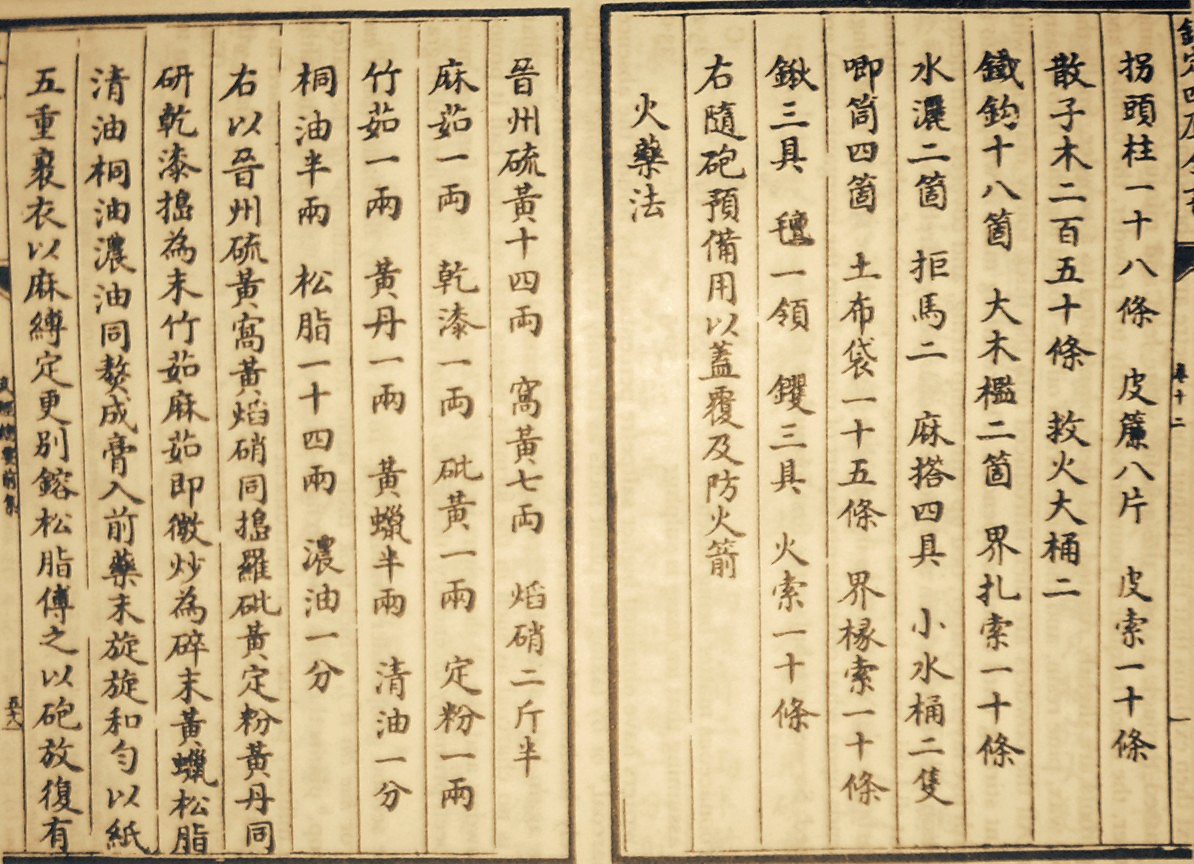
Earliest known written formula for gunpowder, from the Wujing Zongyao of 1044 AD

Gunpowder: Evidence of gunpowder's first use in China comes from the Tang dynasty. The earliest known recorded recipes for gunpowder were written by Zeng Gongliang, Ding Du and Yang Weide in the Wujing Zongyao, a military manuscript compiled in 1044 AD during the Song dynasty. Its gunpowder formulas describe the use of incendiary bombs launched from catapults, thrown down from defensive walls, or lowered down the wall by use of iron chains operated by a swape lever. Bombs launched from trebuchet catapults mounted on forecastles of naval ships ensured the victory of the Song Empire over the Jin regime at the Battle of Caishi in 1161, and the Mongol Yuan state (1271–1368) used gunpowder bombs during their failed invasions of Japan in 1274 and 1281. During the 13th and 14th centuries, gunpowder formulas became more potent (with nitrate levels of up to 91%) and gunpowder weaponry more advanced and deadly, as evidenced in the Ming dynasty (1368–1644) military manuscript Huolongjing compiled by Jiao Yu (fl. 14th to early 15th century) and Liu Bowen (1311–1375). It was completed in 1412, long after Liu's death, with a preface added by Jiao in its Nanyang publication.

=== Compass ===
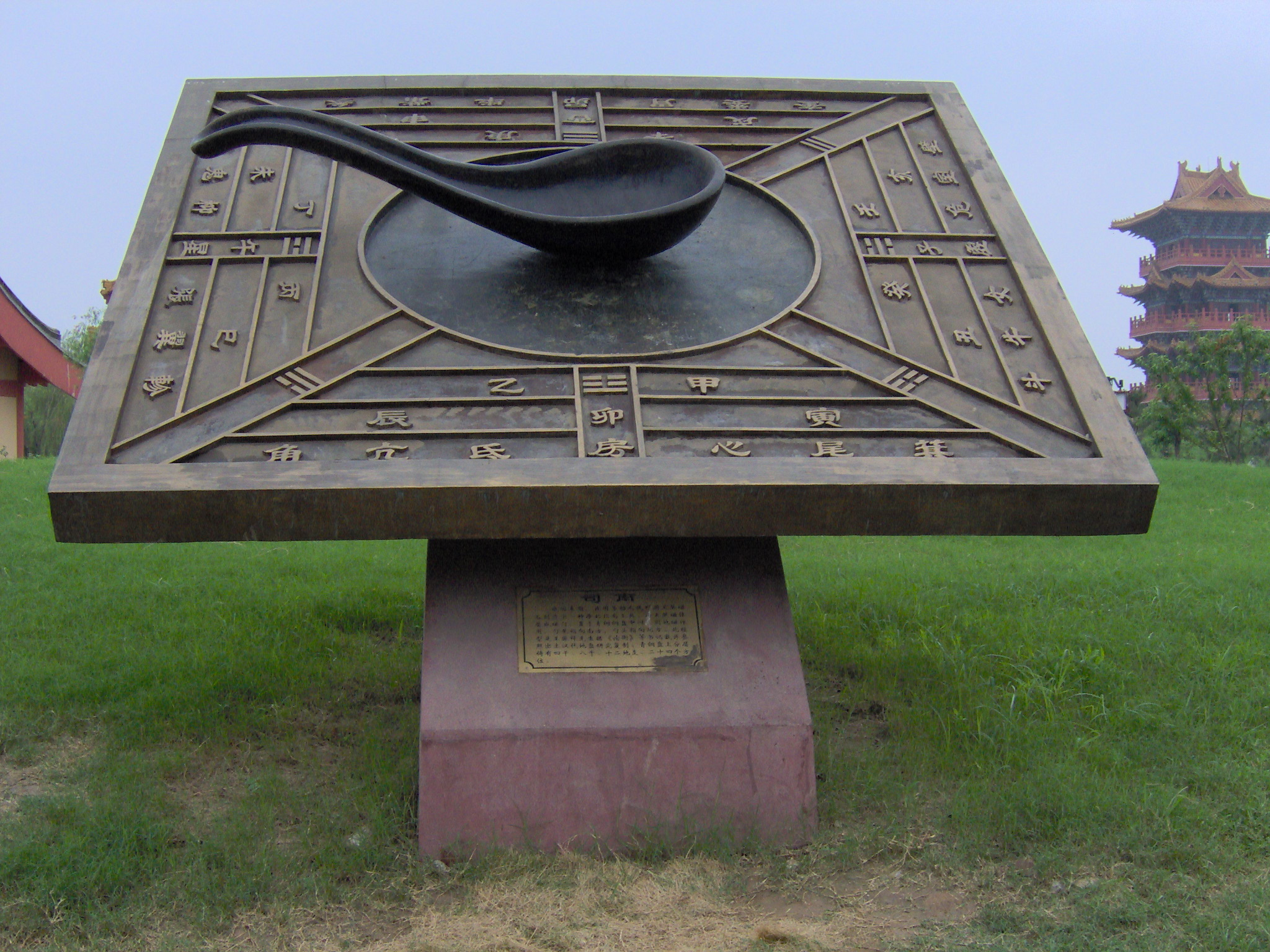
A model in Kaifeng of a Chinese ladle-and-bowl type compass used for geomancy in the Han dynasty (202 BC – 220 AD); the historical authenticity of the model has been questioned by Li Shu-hua (1954).

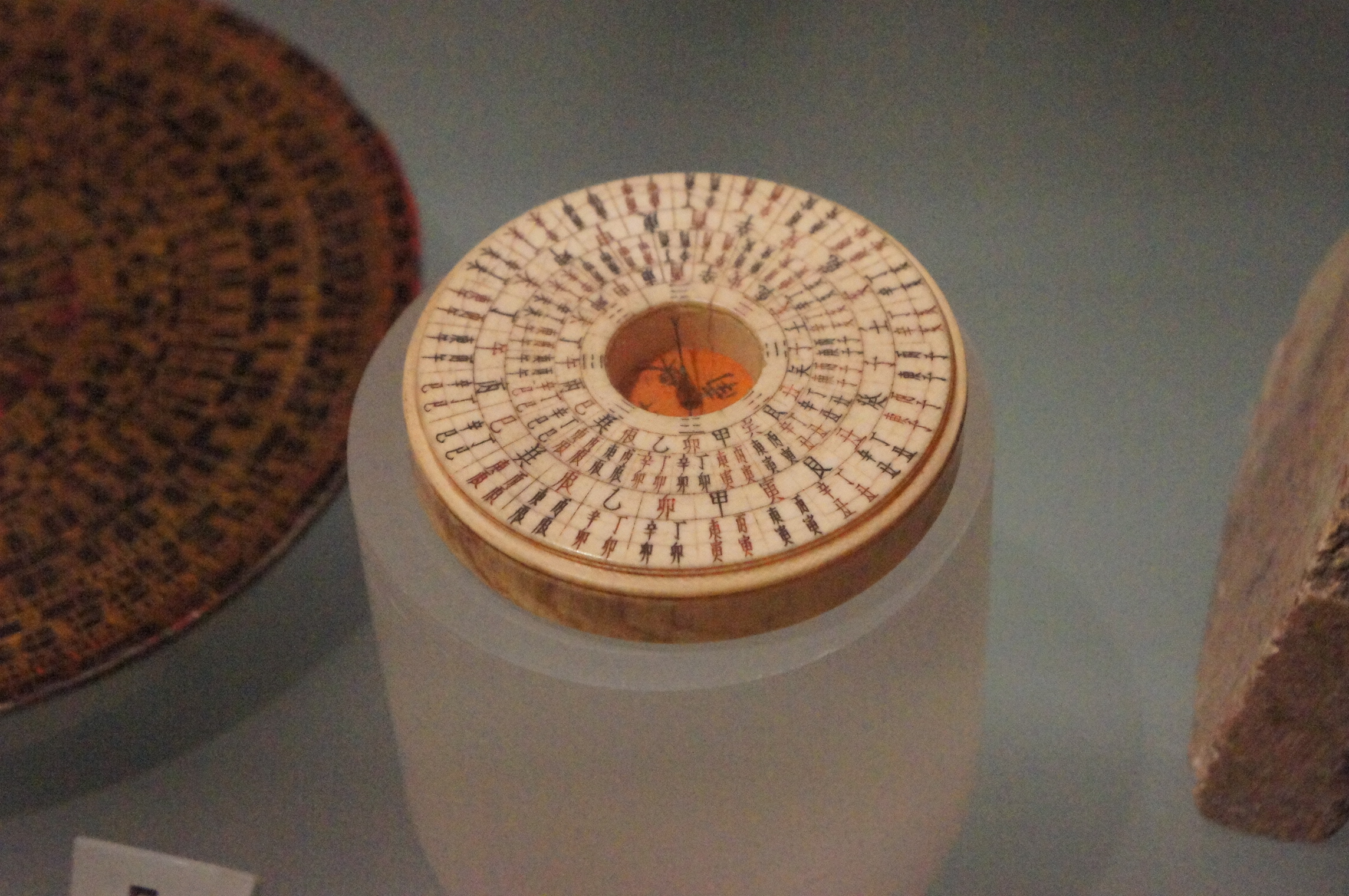
Chinese geomantic compass c. 1760 from the National Maritime Museum in London

Compass: Although an ancient hematite artifact from the Olmec-era in Mexico dating from about 1000 BC indicates the possible use of lodestone as a compass long before it was described in China, the Olmecs could not produce iron, which the Chinese found could be magnetised by contact with lodestone. Descriptions of lodestone attracting iron were made in the Guanzi, Master Lu's Spring and Autumn Annals and the Huainanzi. The Chinese by the Han dynasty (202 BC – 220 AD) began using north–south oriented lodestone ladle-and-bowl shaped compasses for divination and geomancy, but not yet for navigation. The Lunheng, written by Han dynasty writer, scientist, and philosopher Wang Chong (27 – c. 100 AD) stated in chapter 52: "This instrument resembles a spoon and when it is placed on a plate on the ground, the handle points to the south". There are, however, two other references under chapter 47 of the same text to the attractive power of a magnet according to Needham (1986), but Li Shu-hua (1954) considers it to be lodestone, and states that there is no explicit mention of a magnet in Lunheng. The Chinese polymath Shen Kuo (1031–1095) of the Song dynasty was the first to accurately describe both magnetic declination (in discerning true north) and the magnetic needle compass in his Dream Pool Essays of 1088, and the Song dynasty writer Zhu Yu (fl. 12th century) was the first to mention use of the compass specifically for navigation at sea, in his book published in 1119. Even before this, however, the 1044 Wujing Zongyao military manuscript described a thermoremanence compass of heated iron or steel shaped as a fish and placed in a bowl of water which produced a weak magnetic force via remanence and induction; the Wujing Zongyao recorded that it was used as a pathfinder along with the mechanical south-pointing chariot.

== Ancient and Imperial China ==
Inventions which made their first appearance in late Bronze Age China after the Neolithic era, specifically during and after the Shang dynasty (c. 1600–1050 BC), and predating the era of modern China that began in 1912, are listed below in alphabetical order.

=== A ===
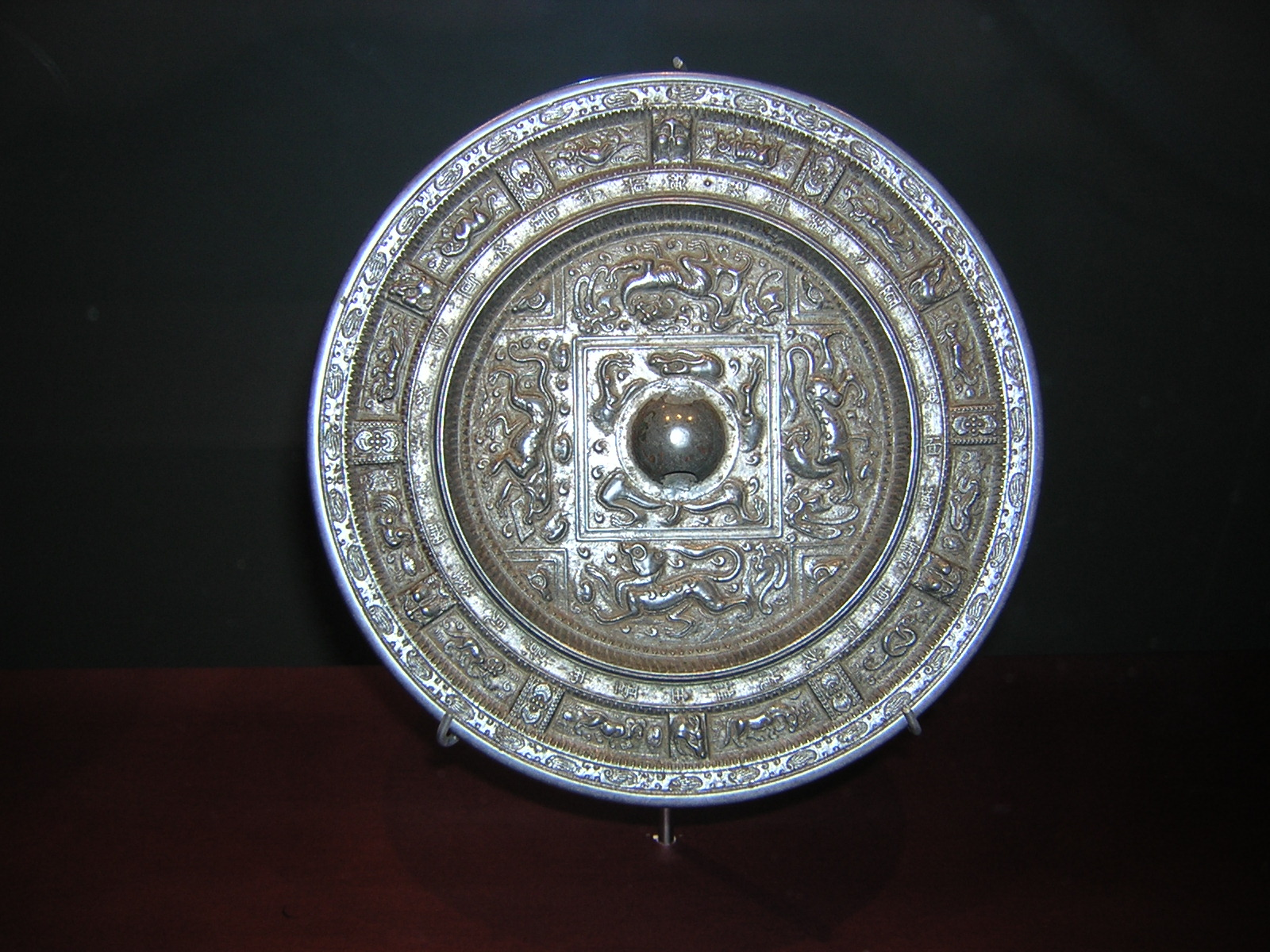
Bronze mirror of the Sui dynasty (581–618) showing the twelve divisions of the Chinese zodiac, the latter of which goes back to the Warring States period (403–221 BC) in China

- Acupuncture: Acupuncture, the traditional Chinese medicinal practice of inserting needles into specific points of the body for therapeutic purposes and relieving pain, was first mentioned in Huangdi Neijing compiled from the 3rd to 2nd centuries BC (Warring States period to Han dynasty). The oldest known acupuncture sticks made of gold, found in the tomb of Liu Sheng (d. 113 BC), date from the Western Han (203 BC – AD 9); the oldest known stone-carved depiction of acupuncture was made during the Eastern Han (AD 25–220).
- Armillary sphere, hydraulic-powered: Poet Eratosthenes (276–194 BC) is credited as the first to invent the armillary sphere representing the celestial sphere. The Chinese astronomer Geng Shouchang of the Han dynasty (202 BC – 220 AD) invented it separately in China in 52 BC, and the Han dynasty polymath Zhang Heng (78–139 AD) was the first to apply motive power using a set of complex gears rotated by a waterwheel which was powered by the constant pressure head of an inflow clepsydra clock, the latter of which he improved with an extra compensating tank between the reservoir and the inflow vessel.

=== B ===
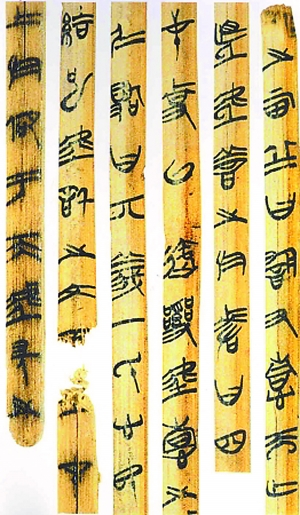
A sample of the Shanghai Museum bamboo slips (c. 300 BC), recording part of a commentary on the Classic of Poetry

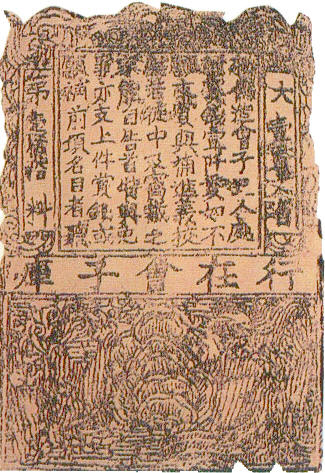
Huizi currency, issued in 1160

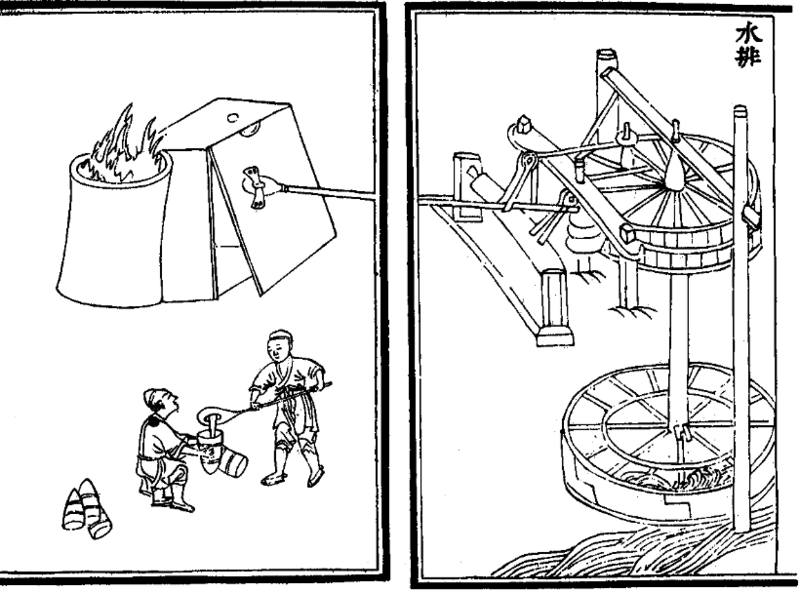
An illustration of furnace bellows operated by waterwheels, from the Nong Shu, by Chinese mechanical engineer and inventor Wang Zhen, 1313 AD, during the Yuan dynasty

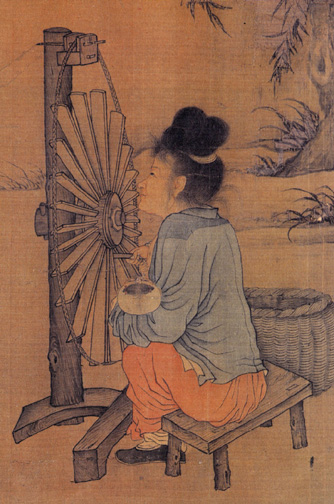
The Spinning Wheel, by Northern Song (960–1127) artist Wang Juzheng. The Chinese invented the belt drive by the 1st century BC for silk quilling devices.

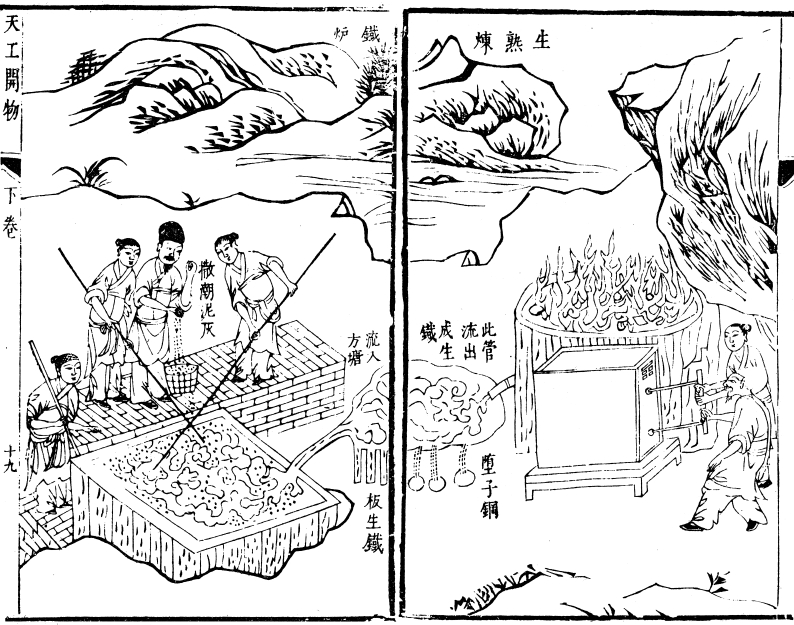
A print illustration from an encyclopedia depicting men employing the fining process to make wrought iron and working a blast furnace by smelting iron ore to produce pig iron

- Banknote: Paper currency was first developed in China. Its roots were in merchant receipts of deposit during the Tang dynasty, as merchants and wholesalers desired to avoid the heavy bulk of copper coinage in large commercial transactions. During the Song dynasty (960–1279), the central government adopted this system for their monopolized salt industry, but a gradual reduction in copper production—due to the closing of mines and an enormous outflow of Song-minted copper currency into the Japanese, Southeast Asian, Western Xia and Liao economies—encouraged the Song government in the early 12th century to issue government-printed paper currency alongside copper to ease the demand on their state mints and debase the value of copper. In the early 11th century, the Song dynasty government authorised sixteen private banks to issue notes of exchange in central China, but in 1023 the government commandeered this enterprise and set up an agency to supervise the manufacture of banknotes there. The earliest paper currency was limited to certain regions and could not be used outside specified bounds, but once paper was securely backed by gold and silver stores, the Song dynasty government initiated a nationwide paper currency, between 1265 and 1274. The concurrent the Jin regime also printed paper banknotes by at least 1214.
- Bellows, hydraulic-powered: Although it is unknown if metallurgic bellows (i.e. air-blowing device) in the Han dynasty (202 BC – 220 AD) were of the leather bag type or the wooden fan type found in the later Yuan state (1279–1368), the Han dynasty mechanical engineer and politician Du Shi (d. 38 AD) applied the use of rotating waterwheels to power the bellows of his blast furnace smelting iron, a method which continued in use in China thereafter, as evidenced by subsequent records; it is a significant invention in that iron production yields were increased and it employed all the necessary components for converting rotary motion into reciprocating motion.
- Belt drive: The mechanical belt drive, using a pulley machine, was first mentioned in the text the Dictionary of Local Expressions by the Han dynasty philosopher, poet, and politician Yang Xiong (53–18 BC) in 15 BC, used for a quilling machine that wound silk fibers on to bobbins for weavers' shuttles. The belt drive is an essential component to the invention of the spinning wheel. The belt drive was not only used in textile technologies, it was also applied to hydraulic powered bellows dating from the 1st century AD.
- Belt hook: The belt hook was a fastener used in China. Belt hooks date from the 7th century BC in China, and were made with bronze, iron, gold, and jade. Texts claim that the belt hook arrived in China from Central Asia during the Warring States period, but archaeological evidence of belt hooks in China predate the Warring States period.
- Biological pest control: The first report of the use of an insect species to control an insect pest comes from Nanfang caomu zhuang (南方草木狀; Plants of the Southern Regions; c. 304 AD), attributed to Western Jin dynasty botanist Ji Han (嵇含, 263–307), in which it is mentioned that "Jiaozhi people sell ants and their nests attached to twigs looking like thin cotton envelopes, the reddish-yellow ant being larger than normal. Without such ants, southern citrus fruits will be severely insect-damaged". The ants used are known as huang gan (huang 'yellow' + gan 'citrus') ants (Oecophylla smaragdina). The practice was later reported by Ling Biao Lu Yi (late Tang dynasty or Early Five Dynasties), in Ji Le Pian by Zhuang Jisu (Southern Song dynasty), in the Book of Tree Planting by Yu Zhen Mu (Ming dynasty), in the book Guangdong Xing Yu (17th century), Lingnan by Wu Zhen Fang (Qing dynasty), in Nanyue Miscellanies by Li Diao Yuan, and others.
- Blast furnace: Although cast iron tools and weapons have been found in China dating from the 5th century BC, the earliest discovered Chinese blast furnaces, which produced pig iron that could be remelted and refined as cast iron in the cupola furnace, date from the 3rd and 2nd centuries BC, and the vast majority of early blast-furnace sites discovered date from the Han dynasty (202 BC – AD 220), immediately following 117 BC with the establishment of state monopolies over the salt and iron industries during the reign of Emperor Wu of Han (r. 141 – 87 BC); most ironwork sites discovered dating from before 117 BC acted merely as foundries to make castings for iron that had been smelted in blast furnaces elsewhere, in remote areas, far from population centres.
- Bomb: The first accounts of bombs made of cast iron shells packed with explosive gunpowder—as opposed to earlier types of casings—were written in the 13th century in China. The term was coined for this bomb (i.e. "thunder-crash bomb") during a Jin dynasty (1115–1234) naval battle of 1231 against the Mongols. The History of Jin (compiled by 1345) states that in 1232, as the Mongol general Subutai (1176–1248) descended on the Jin stronghold of Kaifeng, the defenders had a "thunder-crash bomb" which "consisted of gunpowder put into an iron container ... then when the fuse was lit (and the projectile shot off) there was a great explosion the noise whereof was like thunder, audible for more than a hundred li, and the vegetation was scorched and blasted by the heat over an area of more than half a mou. When hit, even iron armour was quite pierced through." The Song dynasty (960–1279) official Li Zengbo wrote in 1257 that arsenals should have several hundred thousand iron bomb shells available and that when he was in Jingzhou, about 1,000–2,000 were produced each month for dispatch of ten to twenty thousand at a time to Xiangyang and Yingzhou. The significance of this, Needham states, is that a "high-nitrate gunpowder mixture had been reached at last, since nothing less would have burst the iron casing."
- Borehole drilling: By at least the Han dynasty (202 BC – 220 AD), the Chinese used deep borehole drilling for mining and other projects; The British sinologist and historian Michael Loewe states that borehole sites could reach as deep as 600 m (2,000 ft). K. S. Tom describes the drilling process: "The Chinese method of deep drilling was accomplished by a team of men jumping on and off a beam to impact the drilling bit while the boring tool was rotated by buffalo and oxen." This was the same method used for extracting petroleum in California during the 1860s (i.e. "Kicking Her Down"). A Western Han dynasty bronze foundry discovered in Xinglong, Hebei had nearby mining shafts which reached depths of 100 m (330 ft) with spacious mining areas; the shafts and rooms were complete with a timber frame, ladders and iron tools. By the first century BC, Chinese craftsmen cast iron drill bits and drillers were able to drill boreholes up to 4,800 feet (1,500 m) deep. By the eleventh century AD, the Chinese were able to drill boreholes up to 3000 feet in depth. Drilling for boreholes was time-consuming and long. As the depth of the holes varied, the drilling of a single well could take up to nearly one full decade. It wasn't up until the 19th century that Europe and the West would catch up and rival ancient Chinese borehole drilling technology.
- Breeching strap: The breeching strap traces its roots back to the Chinese invented breast-strap or breastcollar harness developed during the Warring States (481–221 BC) era. The Chinese breast harness became known throughout Central Asia by the 7th century, introduced to Europe by the 8th century. The breeching strap would allow the horse to hold or brake the load as horse harnesses were previously attached to vehicles by straps around their necks as previously designed harnesses would constrict the horses neck preventing the horse from pulling heavier loads. The breeching strap acted as a brake when a cart tries to run forward when moving downwards on a slope and also make it possible to maneuver the cart in the reverse direction.
- Brine mining: About 500 BC, the ancient Chinese dug hundreds of brine wells, some of which were over 100 meters (330 feet) in depth. Large brine deposits under the earth's surface were drilled by drilling boreholes. Bamboo towers were erected, similar in style to modern-day oil derricks. Bamboo was used for ropes, casing, and derricks since it was salt resistant. Iron wedges were hung from a bamboo cable tool attached to a lever on a platform constructed atop the tower. The derricks required two to three men jumping on and off the lever that moved the iron wedge pounded into the ground to dig a hole deep enough into the ground to hit the brine.
- Bristle toothbrush: According to the United States Library of Congress website, the Chinese have used the bristle toothbrush since 1498, during the reign of the Hongzhi Emperor (r. 1487–1505) of the Ming dynasty; it also adds that the toothbrush was not mass-produced until 1780, when they were sold by a William Addis of Clerkenwell, London, England. In accordance with the Library of Congress website, scholar John Bowman also writes that the bristle toothbrush using pig bristles was invented in China during the 1490s. Bonnie L. Kendall agrees with this, and adds that a precursor existed in Ancient Egypt, in the form of a twig frayed at the end.

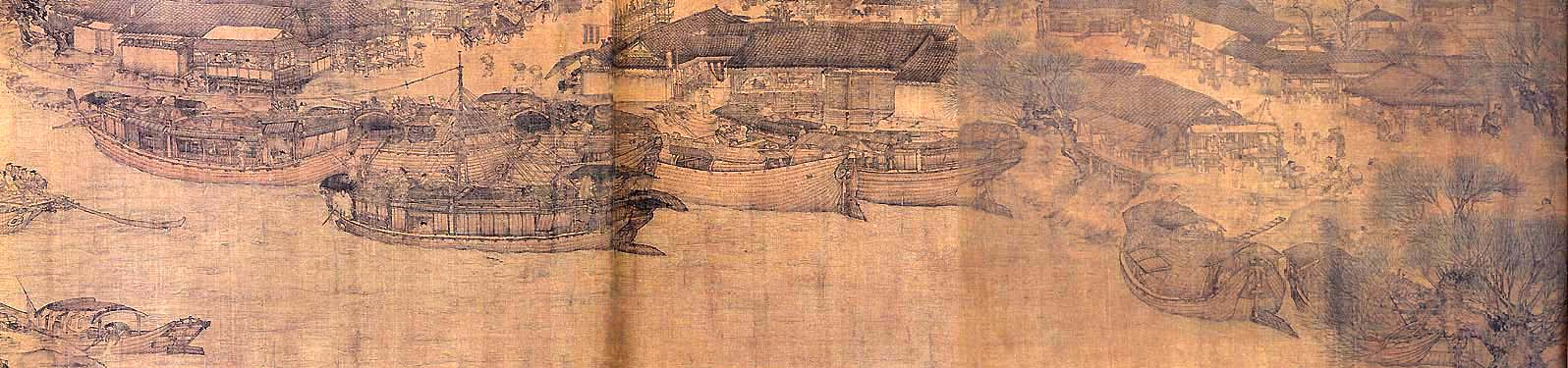
Chinese river ships from Along the River During Qingming Festival, by Zhang Zeduan (1085–1145), Song dynasty

- Bulkhead partition: The 5th century book Garden of Strange Things by Liu Jingshu mentioned that a ship could allow water to enter the bottom without sinking, and the Song dynasty author Zhu Yu (fl. 12th century) wrote in his book of 1119 that the hulls of Chinese ships had a bulkhead build; these pieces of literary evidence for bulkhead partitions are confirmed by archaeological evidence of a 24 m (79 ft) long Song dynasty ship dredged from the waters off the southern coast of China in 1973, the hull of the ship divided into twelve walled compartmental sections built watertight, dated to about 1277. Western writers from Marco Polo (1254–1324), to Niccolò Da Conti (1395–1469), to Benjamin Franklin (1706–1790) commented on bulkhead partitions, which they viewed as an original aspect of Chinese shipbuilding, as Western shipbuilding did not incorporate this hull arrangement until the early 19th century.

=== C ===
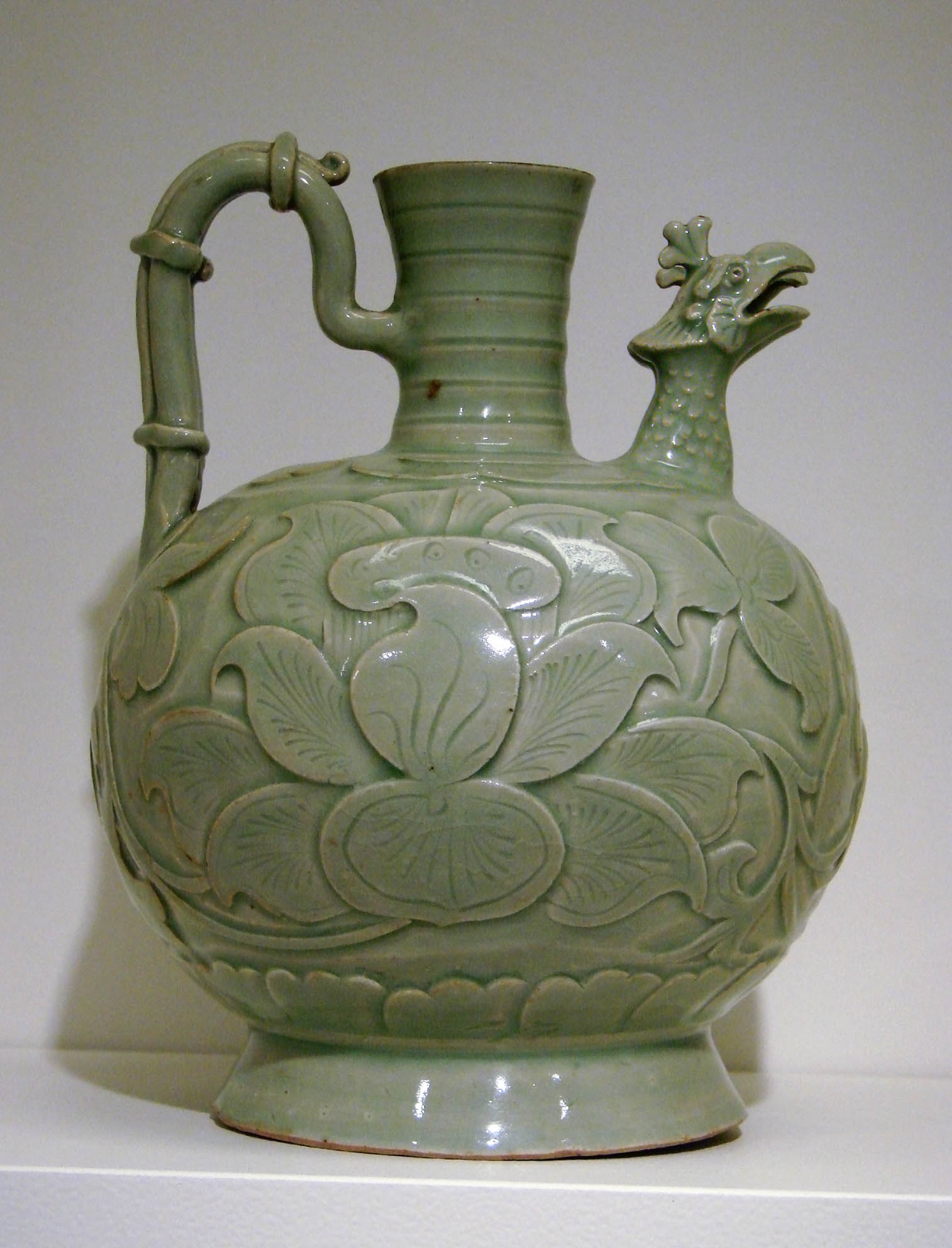
A late 10th century grey sandstone and celadon-glazed pitcher from the Song dynasty (960–1279); the spout is in the form of a fenghuang head.

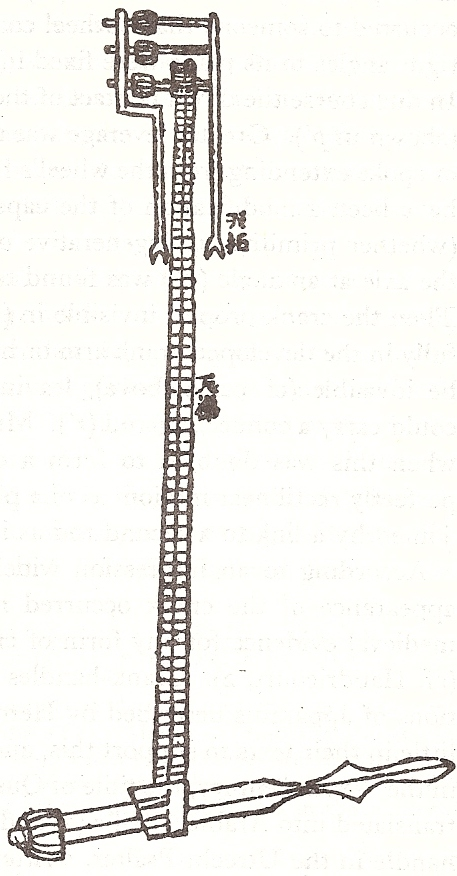
The endless power-transmitting chain drive from Su Song's book of 1094 describing his clock tower

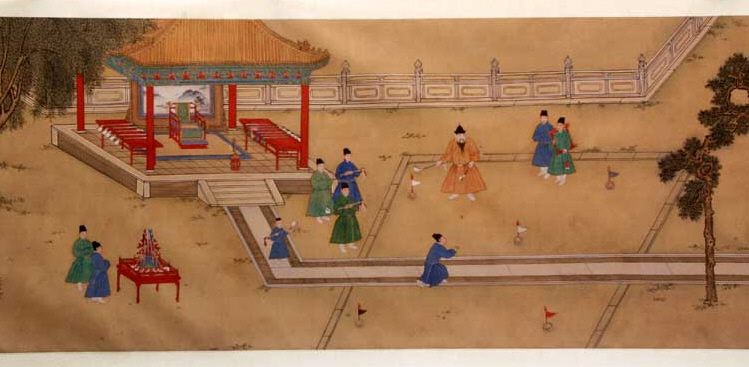
The Xuande Emperor (r. 1425–1435) playing chuiwan with his eunuchs

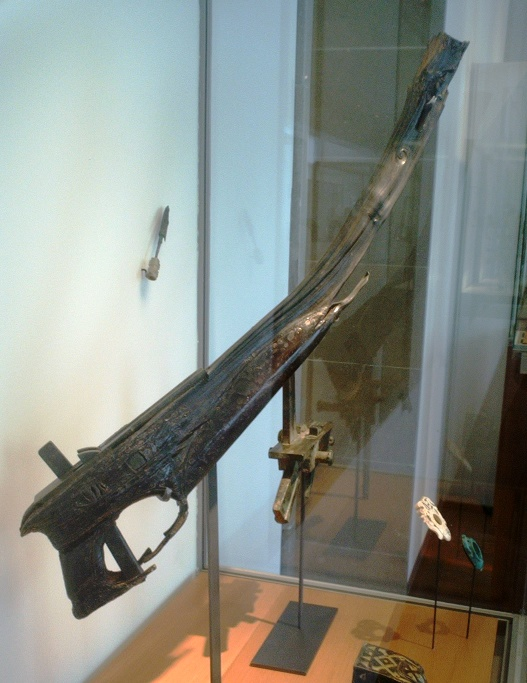
A hand-held, trigger-operated crossbow from the 2nd century BC, Han dynasty

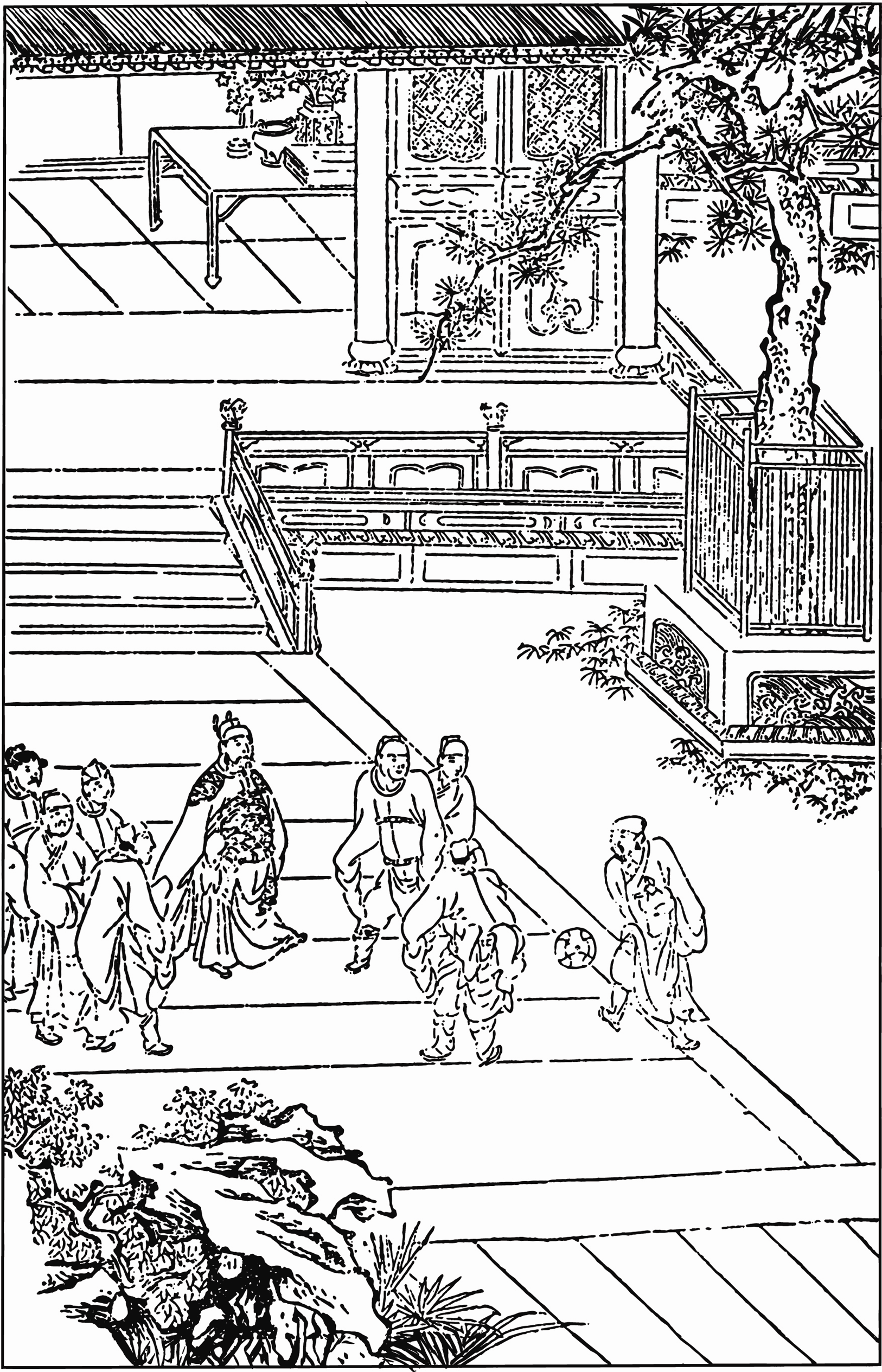
A 15th-century Ming dynasty (1368–1644) woodblock print of the Water Margin novel showing a game of cuju football being played

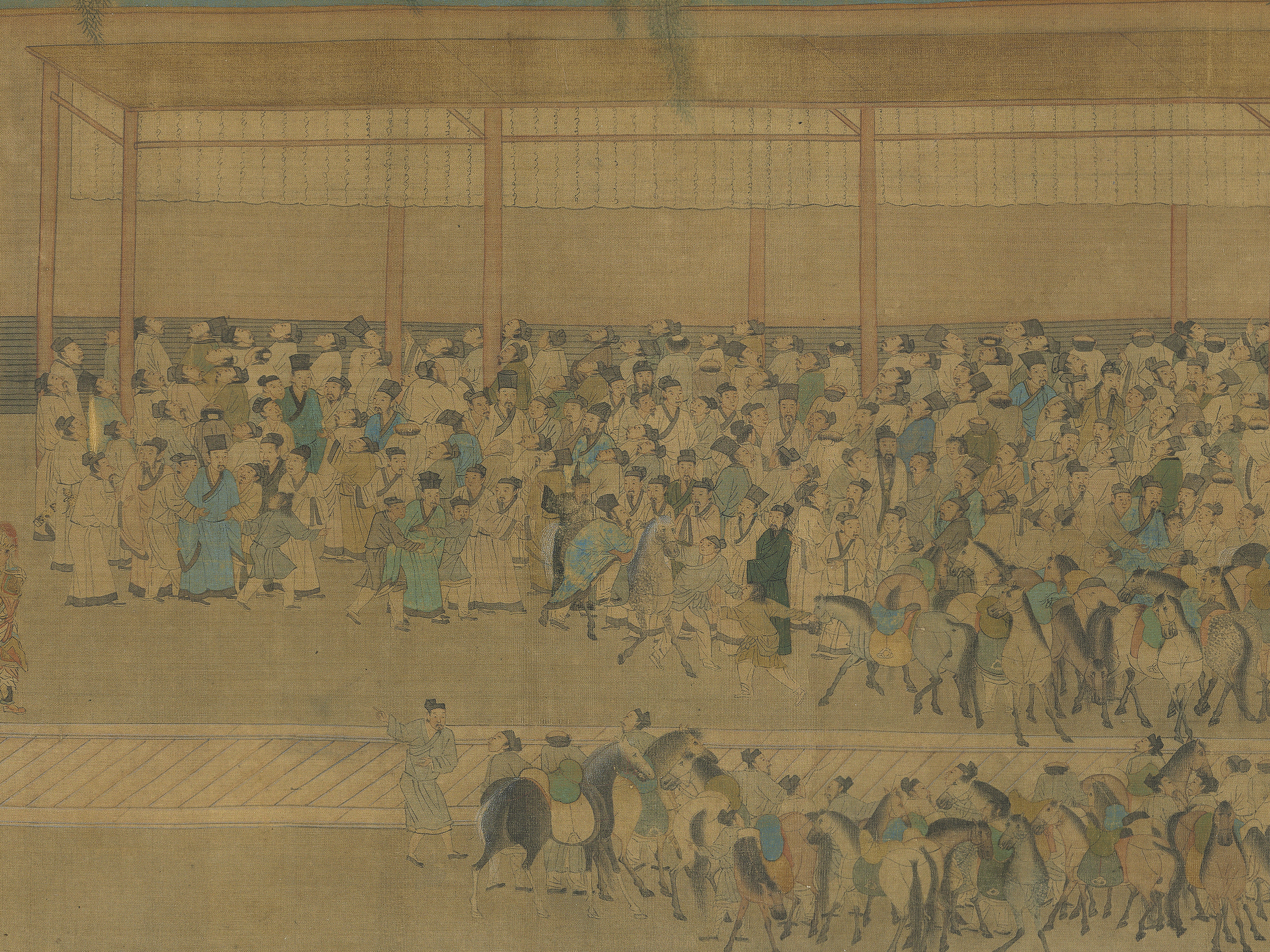
Candidates gathering around the wall where the civil service examination results are posted. This announcement was known as "releasing the roll" (放榜). (c. 1540, by Ming dynasty painter Qiu Ying)

- Candle clock: Candle clocks have been used in China since at least the 6th century AD. The earliest reference of a candle clock is in a poem by You Jiangu, from about AD 520.
- Cannon: The earliest known depiction of a cannon is a sculpture from the Dazu Rock Carvings in Sichuan dated to 1128; but the earliest archaeological samples and textual accounts do not appear until the 13th century. The primary extant specimens of cannons from the 13th century are the Wuwei Bronze Cannon, dated to 1227; the Heilongjiang hand cannon, dated to 1288; and the Xanadu Gun, dated to 1298. Only the Xanadu gun contains an inscription bearing a date of production, so it is considered the earliest confirmed extant cannon. The Xanadu Gun is 34.7 cm long and weighs 6.2 kg. The other cannons are dated using contextual evidence. The oldest representation of a bombard can be found in the Chinese town of Ta-tsu. In 1985, a Canadian historian, Robin Yates, saw a sculpture on the wall of a Buddhist cave temple, depicting a demon holding a hand-held bombard. The muzzle seems to have a blast and flames coming from it, which some believe is proof of a super gun. Yates examined the cave and believed the drawings dated from the late 12th century.
- Cast iron: Confirmed by archaeological evidence, cast iron, made from melting pig iron, was developed in China by the early 5th century BC during the Zhou dynasty (1122–256 BC), the oldest specimens found in a tomb of Luhe County in Jiangsu province; despite this, most of the early blast furnaces and cupola furnaces discovered in China date from after the establishment, in 117 BC, of the state iron monopoly under Emperor Wu (r. 141–87 BC), during the Han dynasty (202 BC – AD 220); Donald Wagner states that a possible reason why no ancient Chinese bloomery process has been discovered is that the iron monopoly, which lasted until the 1st century AD, when it was abolished for private entrepreneurship and local administrative use, wiped out any need for continuing the less efficient bloomery process, which continued in use in other parts of the world. Cast iron is comparatively brittle and is not suitable for purposes where a sharp edge or flexibility is required. An important Chinese innovation was the development of malleable iron in the 4th century BC, which enhanced the mechanical properties of cast iron through an annealing process. Furthermore, Wagner states that most iron tools in ancient China were made of cast iron in consideration of the low economic burden of producing cast iron, whereas most iron military weapons were made of more costly wrought iron and steel, signifying that "high performance was essential" and preferred for the latter.
- Celadon: Named after a pale-tinted spring green colour, Chinese archaeologist Wang Zhongshu (1982) asserts that shards having this type of ceramic glaze have been recovered from the Eastern Han dynasty (25–220 AD) tomb excavations in Zhejiang; he also asserts that this type of ceramic became well known during the Three Kingdoms (220–265). Richard Dewar (2002) disagrees with Wang's classification, stating that true celadon—which requires a minimum 1,260 °C (2,300 °F) furnace temperature, a preferred range of 1,285 to 1,305 °C (2,345 to 2,381 °F), and reduced firing—was not created until the beginning of the Northern Song dynasty (960–1127). The unique grey or green celadon glaze is a result of iron oxide's transformation from ferric to ferrous iron (Fe_{2}O_{3} → FeO) during the firing process. Longquan celadon wares, which the archaeologist Nigel Wood at the University of Oxford writes were first made during the Northern Song, had bluish, blue-green, and olive green glazes and high silica and alkali contents which resembled later porcelain ware made at Jingdezhen and Dehua rather than stoneware.
- Censer: The earliest known censers can be traced back to the Warring States period in the mid-fifth to late fourth centuries BCE. In modern Chinese, the term for "censer" is xianglu (香爐, "incense burner"), a compound of xiang ("incense, aromatics") and lu (爐, "brazier; stove; furnace"). Another frequently used term is xunlu (熏爐, "a brazier for fumigating and perfuming"). Initial designs of Chinese censers, typically crafted as a round, single-footed stemmed basin, are thought to have evolved from ritual bronzes, such as the dou 豆 sacrificial chalice.
- Chain drive, endless power-transmitting: The Greek Philo of Byzantium (3rd or 2nd century BC) described a chain drive and windlass used in the operation of a polybolos (a repeating ballista), "but the chain drive did not continuously transmit power from shaft to shaft and hence they were not in the direct line of ancestry of the chain-drive proper". A continuously driven chain drive first appeared in 11th-century China. Perhaps inspired by chain pumps which had been known in China since at least the Han dynasty (202 BC – 220 AD) when they were mentioned by the Han dynasty philosopher Wang Chong (27 – c. 100 AD), the endless power-transmitting chain drive was first used in the gearing of the clock tower built at Kaifeng in 1090 by the Song Chinese politician, mathematician and astronomer Su Song (1020–1101).
- Chopsticks: The Han dynasty historian and writer Sima Qian (145–86 BC) wrote in the Records of the Grand Historian that King Zhou of Shang was the first to make chopsticks out of ivory, in the 11th century BC; the oldest archaeological find of a pair of chopsticks, made of bronze, comes from Shang Tomb 1005 at Houjiazhuang, Anyang, dated to about 1200 BC. By 600 BC, the use of chopsticks had spread to Yunnan (Dapona in Dali), and Töv Province by the 1st century. The earliest known textual reference to the use of chopsticks comes from the Han Feizi, a philosophical text written by writer and philosopher Han Fei (c. 280–233 BC) in the 3rd century BC.
- Chuiwan: Chuiwan, a game similar to the Scottish-derived sport of golf, was first mentioned in China by Song dynasty writer Wei Tai (fl. 1050–1100) in his Dongxuan Records (東軒錄); it was popular amongst men and women in the Song (960–1279) and Yuan dynasties (1279–1368), and among urban men in the Ming dynasty (1368–1644), in much the same way that tennis was for early urban Europeans during the Renaissance (according to Andrew Leibs). In 1282, the writer Ning Zhi published the Book of Chuiwan, which described the rules, equipment, and playing field of chuiwan, as well as included commentary of those who mastered its tactics. The game was played on flat and sloping grassland terrain and—much like the tee of modern golf—had a base area where the first of three strokes were played.
- Civil service: During the Han dynasty (202 BC – 220 AD), the xiaolian system of recruiting government officials through formal recommendations was the chief method of filling bureaucratic posts, although there was an Imperial Academy to train potential candidates for office and some offices required its candidates to pass formal written tests before appointment. However, it was not until the Sui dynasty (581–618) that civil service examinations became open to all adult males not belonging to the merchant class (although civil service examinations was a path to social advancement in Imperial Chinese society to candidates regardless of wealth, social status, or family background) and were used as a universal prerequisite for appointments to office, at least in theory. The civil service system was implemented on a much larger scale during the Song dynasty (960–1279), when an elite core of dynastic-founding and professional families lost their majority in government to a broad strata of lesser gentry families from throughout the country. The civil examination system was later adopted by China's other East Asian neighbors Japan and Korea. The imperial examination system attracted much attention and greatly inspired political theorists in the Western World, and as a Chinese institution was one of the earliest to receive such foreign attention. The Chinese examination system was introduced to the Western world in reports by European missionaries and diplomats, and encouraged the British East India Company to use a similar method to select prospective employees. After the initial success in that company, the British government adopted a similar testing system for screening civil servants in 1855. Other European nations, such as France and Germany, followed suit. Modeled after these previous adaptations, the United States established its own testing program for certain government jobs after 1883.
- Co-fusion steel process: Although Needham speculates that it could have existed beforehand, the first clear written evidence of the fusion of wrought iron and cast iron to make steel comes from the 6th century AD in regards to the Daoist swordsmith Qiwu Huaiwen, who was put in charge of the arsenal of Northern Wei general Gao Huan from 543 to 550 AD. The Tang dynasty (618–907) Newly Reorganized Pharmacopoeia of 659 also described this process of mixing and heating wrought iron and cast iron together, stating that the steel product was used to make sickles and Chinese sabers. In regards to the latter text, Su Song (1020–1101) made a similar description and noted the steel's use for making swords.
- Coke, fuel: By the 11th century, during the Song dynasty (960–1279), the demands for charcoal used in the blast and cupola furnaces of the iron industry led to large amounts of deforestation of prime timberland; to avoid excessive deforestation, the Song dynasty Chinese began using coke made from bituminous coal as fuel for their metallurgic furnaces instead of charcoal derived from wood.
- Color printing: By at least the Yuan dynasty, China had invented color printing for paper. British art historian Michael Sullivan writes that "the earliest color printing known in China, and indeed in the whole world, is a two-color frontispiece to a Buddhist sutra scroll, dated 1346".
- Counting rods: Counting rods are instruments used for performing calculations, which uses a grid of cells to represent a decimal position system. Each digit (0–9) appears as a tally of rods with red rods designated as positive numbers and black rods designated as negative numbers. Archaeological evidence of counting rods dates from the 2nd century BC. The earliest pictorial depiction of counting rods appears on Warring States period ceramics excavated in Dengfeng in Henan. The oldest surviving counting rods are bamboo rods discovered in a Han dynasty tomb at Fenghuangshan in Hubei, which dates from the reign Emperor Wen of Han. The first explicit textual description of counting rods is recorded in the Book of Han, compiled by Ban Gu from about AD 60; but there has been speculation about textual references as early as the 3rd century BC. For example, one passage in the Tao Te Ching mentions that "a person good at shu [calculations] does not use bamboo tallies and bamboo slips."
- Crossbow and repeating crossbow: According to British art historian Matthew Landruss and Gerald Hurley, Chinese crossbows may have been invented as far back as 2000 BC; Anne McCants, an American historian at the Massachusetts institute of Technology, speculates that they existed about 1200 BC. In China bronze crossbow bolts dating from as early as the mid 5th century BC were found at a State of Chu burial site in Yutaishan, Hubei. The earliest handheld crossbow stocks with bronze trigger, dating from the 6th century BC, comes from Tomb 3 and 12 found at Qufu, Shandong, capital of the State of Lu. Other early finds of crossbows were discovered in Tomb 138 at Saobatang, Hunan, dated to the mid 4th century BC. Repeating crossbows, first mentioned in the Records of the Three Kingdoms, were discovered in 1986 in Tomb 47 at Qinjiazui, Hubei, dated to about the 4th century BC. The earliest textual evidence of the handheld crossbow used in battle dates from the 4th century BC. Handheld crossbows with complex bronze trigger mechanisms have also been found with the Terracotta Army in the tomb of Qin Shihuang (r. 221–210 BC) that are similar to specimens from the subsequent Han dynasty (202 BC – 220 AD); crossbowmen described in the Han dynasty learned drill formations, some were mounted as cavalry units, and Han dynasty writers attributed the success of numerous battles against the Xiongnu to massed crossbow fire.
- Cuju (football): The game of football known as cuju was first mentioned in China by two historical texts; the Zhan Guo Ce (compiled from the 3rd to 1st centuries BC) and the Records of the Grand Historian (published in 91 BC) by Sima Qian (145–86 BC). Both texts recorded that during the Warring States period (403–221 BC) the people of Linzi city, capital of the State of Qi, enjoyed playing cuju along with partaking in many other pastimes such as cockfighting. Besides being a recreational sport, playing cuju was also considered a military training exercise and means for soldiers to keep fit.
- Cupola furnace: An American anthropologist, Vincent C. Pigott, of the University of Pennsylvania, states that the cupola furnace existed in China at least by the Warring States period (403–221 BC); Donald B. Wagner writes that some iron ore melted in the blast furnace may have been cast directly into molds, but most, if not all, iron smelted in the blast furnace during the Han dynasty (202 BC – 220 AD) was remelted in a cupola furnace; it was designed so that a cold blast injected at the bottom traveled through tuyere pipes across the top where the charge (i.e. of charcoal and scrap or pig iron) was dumped, the air becoming a hot blast before reaching the bottom of the furnace where the iron was melted and then drained into appropriate molds for casting.

=== D ===
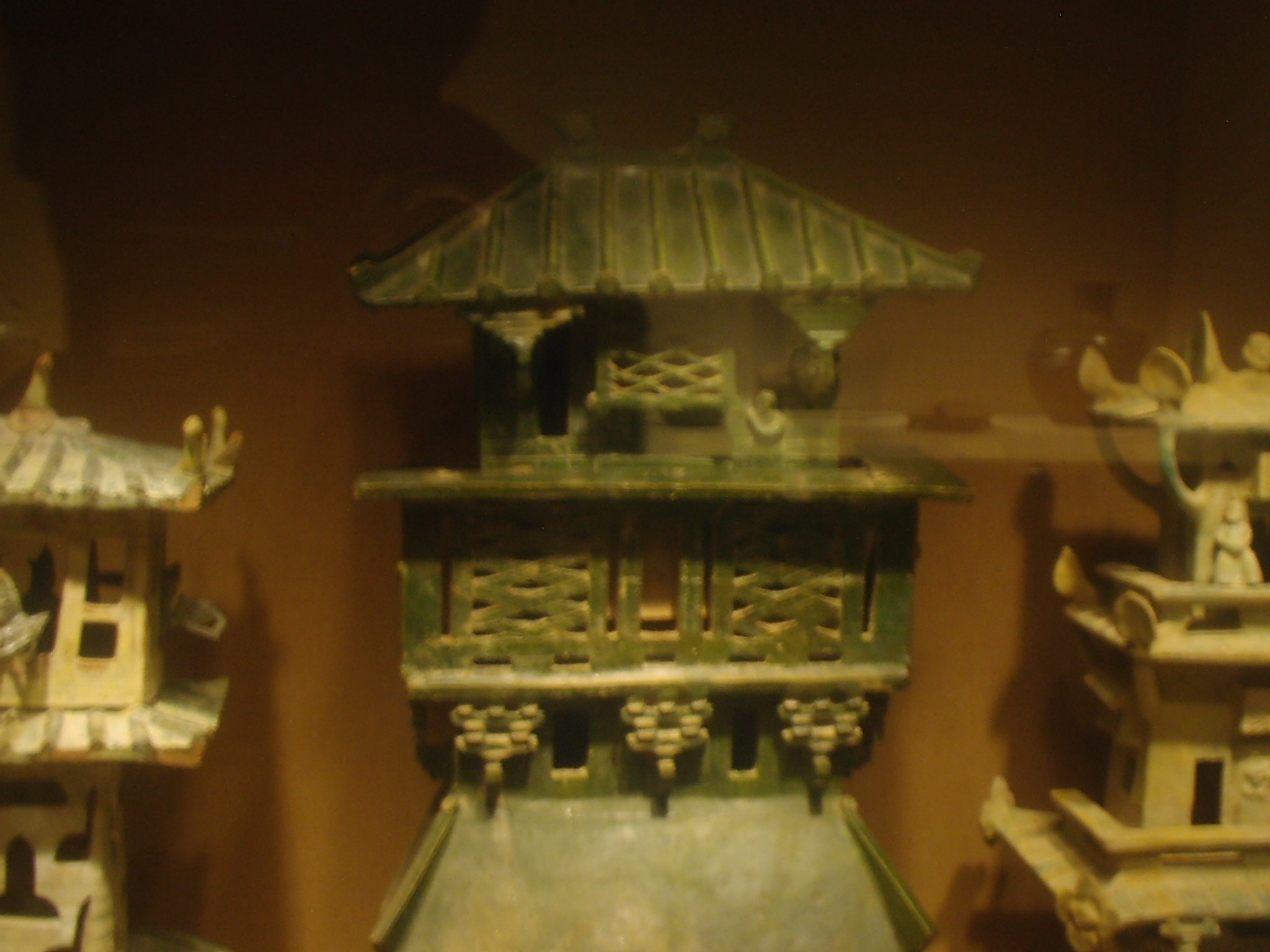
Ceramic models of watchtowers from the Han dynasty (202 BC – 220 AD) showing use of dougong brackets

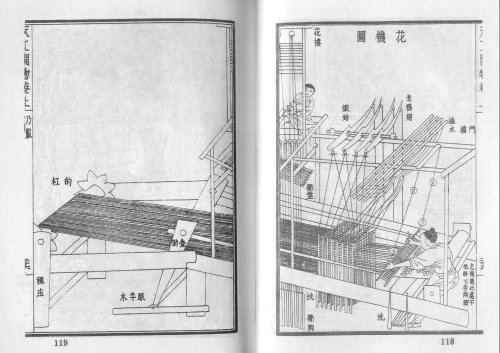
A giant drawloom for figure weaving, from the Chinese Tiangong Kaiwu encyclopedia published by Ming dynasty encyclopedist and scientist Song Yingxing in 1637

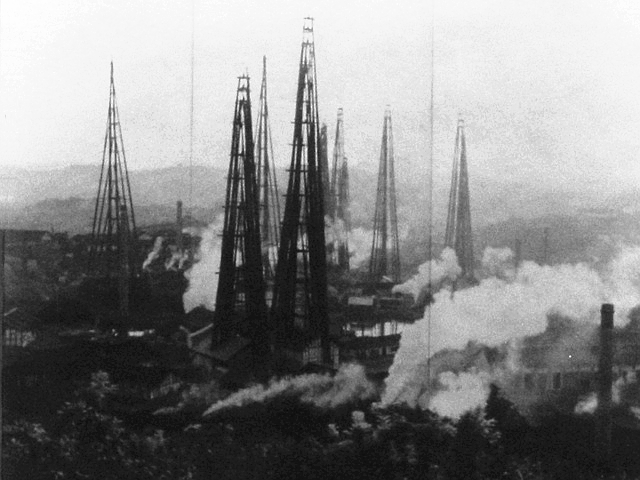
Antique drilling rigs in Zigong, China

- Dental amalgam: Dental amalgam were used in the first part of the Tang dynasty (618–907 A.D.). Evidence of a dental amalgam first appears in the medical text Hsin Hsiu Pen Tsao written by Su Kung in 659, manufactured from tin and silver. Historical records indicate the use of dental amalgam earlier. The composition of an early dental amalgam was published in the Ming dynasty, and a text written by Liu Wen Taiin 1505 states that it consists of "100 shares of mercury, 45 shares of silver and 900 shares of tin."
- Diabolo: Archaeologists theorize that diabolos (or Chinese yo-yo) originated from Chinese spinning top. In the Hemudu Excavation, wooden tops were excavated. To extend the spinning time of the tops, whips were used to spin them. It was believed that poet Cao Zhi in the Three Kingdoms period had composed the poem "Rhapsody of Diabolos" (空竹赋), making it the first record of the diabolo in history. However, the authenticity of the poem requires further research and proof. By the medieval Tang dynasty, the Chinese diabolo became widespread as a toy. A Taiwanese scholar Wu Shengda 吳盛達 argues that records of diabolos only appeared during late Ming dynasty's Wanli period, with its details well recorded in the book Dijing Jingwulue, referring to diabolos as Kong Zhong (simplified Chinese: 空钟; traditional Chinese: 空鐘; pinyin: kōng zhong; lit. 'air bell' ). The first mention of a diabolo in the Western World was made by a missionary, Father Amiot, in Beijing in 1792 during Lord Macartney's ambassadorship, after which examples were brought to Europe, as was the sheng (eventually adapted to the harmonica and accordion).
- Dominoes: The Ming dynasty (1368–1644) writer Xie Zhaozhe (1567–1624) initiated the legend that dominoes were first presented to the imperial court in 1112. However, the oldest confirmed written mention of dominoes in China comes from the Former Events in Wulin (i.e. the capital Hangzhou) written by the Yuan dynasty (1271–1368) author Zhou Mi (1232–1298), who listed pupai (gambling plaques or dominoes) as well as dice as items sold by peddlers during the reign of Emperor Xiaozong of Song (r. 1162–1189). Andrew Lo asserts that Zhou Mi meant dominoes when referring to pupai, since the Ming author Lu Rong (1436–1494) explicitly defined pupai as dominoes (in regards to a story of a suitor who won a maiden's hand by drawing out four winning pupai from a set). The earliest known manual written about dominoes is the Manual of the Xuanhe Period (1119–1125) written by Qu You (1347–1433). In the Encyclopedia of a Myriad of Treasures, Zhang Pu (1602–1641) described the game of laying out dominoes as pupai, although the character for pu had changed (yet retained the same pronunciation). Traditional Chinese domino games include Tien Gow, Pai Gow, Che Deng, and others. The thirty-two-piece Chinese domino set (made to represent each possible face of two thrown dice and thus have no blank faces) differs from the twenty-eight-piece domino set found in the Western World during the mid 18th century (in France and Italy). Dominoes first appeared in Italy during the 18th century, and although it is unknown how Chinese dominoes developed into the modern game, it is speculated that Italian missionaries in China may have brought and introduced the game to Europe.
- Dougong: A dougong is a building bracket which is unique to Chinese architecture. Since at least the Western Zhou dynasty (c. 1050–771 BC), they were placed between the top of a column and a crossbeam to support the concave roofs of beam-in-tier buildings which were archetypal of Chinese architecture. Each dougong is formed by double bow-shaped arms (拱, gong) supported by a wooden block (斗, dou) on each side. Dougong were also used for decorative and ceremonial rather than entirely pragmatic purposes of support, such as on solid brick pagodas like the Iron Pagoda built in 1049. The Yingzao Fashi building manual published in 1103 by the Song dynasty (960–1279) official Li Jie featured illustrations and descriptions of dougong.
- Drawloom: The earliest confirmed drawloom fabrics come from the State of Chu and date from about 400 BC. Most scholars attribute the invention of the drawloom to the ancient Chinese, although some speculate an independent invention from ancient Syria since drawloom fabrics found in Dura-Europas are thought to date from before AD 256. Dieter Kuhn states that an analysis of texts and textiles from the Han dynasty (202 BC – 220 AD) proves that the figured fabrics of that era were also crafted with the use of a drawloom. The drawloom was certainly known in Persia by the 6th century AD. Eric Broudy asserts there is virtually no evidence of its use in Europe until the 17th century, and the button drawloom was allegedly invented by Jean le Calabrais in the 15th century. Mary Carolyn Beaudry disagrees, stating that it was used in the medieval Italian silk industry.
- Drilling rig: The technique of percussion drilling for oil and gas originated during the Han dynasty, when it (churn drilling) was used to extract natural gas in Sichuan province. Iron bits were fastened to long bamboo poles, which were centered within a bamboo derrick. The poles were repeatedly hoisted, using cables woven from bamboo fiber. With the assistance of levers, very heavy bits could be raised, of sufficient weight to percussively bore through rock when repeatedly dropped. Han dynasty oil wells were about 10 meters deep; by the 10th century, depths of 100 meters could be achieved. By the 16th century, Chinese oil prospectors were using percussion drilling to create wells over 2000 feet deep. A modernized variant of the technique was used by American businessman Edwin Drake to drill Pennsylvania's first oil well in 1859, using small steam engines to power the drilling process.

=== E ===
- Escapement, hydraulic-powered (use in clock tower): The escapement mechanism was first described for a mechanical washstand by the Greek Philo of Byzantium who also indicated that it was already used for clocks. An escapement mechanism for clockworks was later developed by the Buddhist monk, court astronomer, mathematician and engineer Yi Xing (683–727) of the Tang dynasty (618–907) for his water-powered celestial globe in the tradition of the Han dynasty polymath and inventor Zhang Heng (78–139), and could be found in later Chinese clockworks such as the clock towers developed by the military engineer Zhang Sixun (fl. late 10th century) and polymath inventor Su Song (1020–1101). Yi Xing's escapement allowed for a bell to be rung automatically every hour, and a drum beaten automatically every quarter-hour, essentially a striking clock. Unlike the modern escapement which employs a suspended oscillating pendulum resting and releasing its hooks on a small rotating gear wheel, the early Chinese escapement employed the use of gravity and hydraulics. In Su Song's clock tower, scoop containers fixed to the spokes of a vertical waterwheel (which acted like a gear wheel) would be filled one by one with siphoned water from a clepsydra tank. When the weight of the water in the scoop filled to an excess, it overcame a counterweight that in turn tripped a lever allowing the scoop to rotate on a pivot and drain its water. However, as the scoop fell, it tripped a coupling tongue that temporarily pulled down on a long vertical chain, the latter yanking down on a balancing lever which would pull upward on a small chain connected to a locking arm, the latter lifting momentarily to release the top arrested spoke before coming back down to repeat the entire process over again. It should be pointed out that the Chinese intermittently working liquid-driven escapement had "only the name in common" with the true mechanical escapement of medieval European mechanical clocks of the 14th century onwards, which worked instead with weights, producing continuous but discrete beats and that derived from the Greek and Roman verge mechanism (alarum) device of earlier mechanisms.
- Exploding cannonball: The Huolongjing military manual compiled by the Ming dynasty military official Jiao Yu (fl. 14th to early 15th century) and the Ming dynasty military strategist and philosopher Liu Bowen (1311–1375) in the mid 14th century described the earliest known exploding cannonballs, which were made of cast iron with a hollow core packed with gunpowder. Jiao and Liu wrote that when fired, they could set enemy camps ablaze. The earliest evidence for exploding cannonballs in Europe date from the 16th century. The Huolongjing also specified the use of poison and blinding gunpowder filled into exploding shells; the effects of this chemical warfare were described thus: "Enemy soldiers will get their faces and eyes burnt, and the smoke will attack their noses, mouths, and eyes."

=== F ===
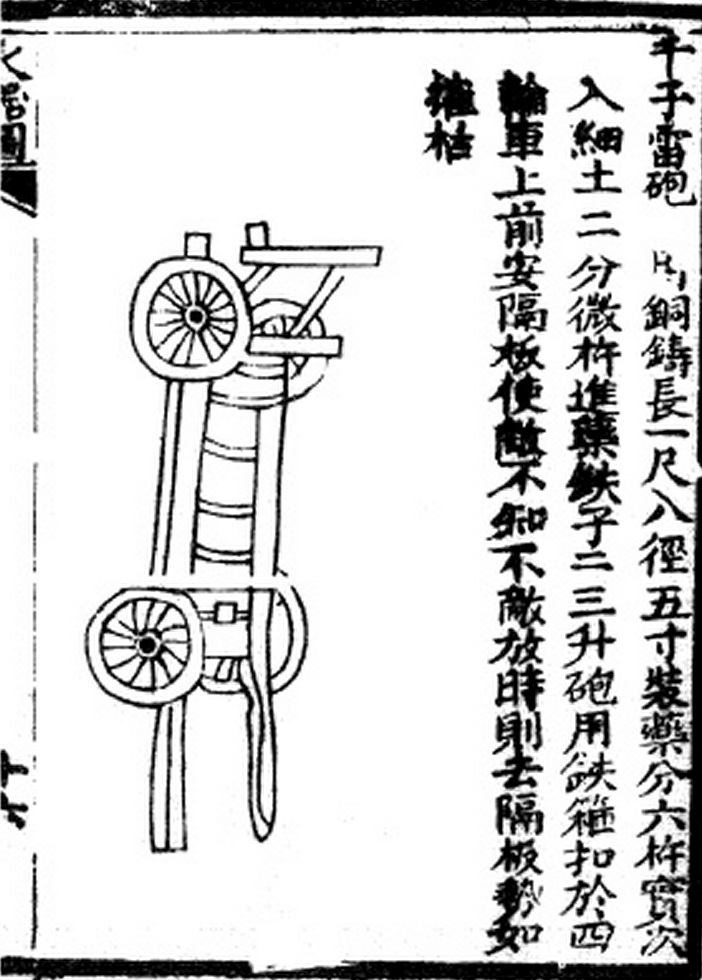
An illustration of a bronze thousand ball thunder cannon from the 14th-century Ming dynasty book Huolongjing. The cannon is an early example of medieval mobile artillery.

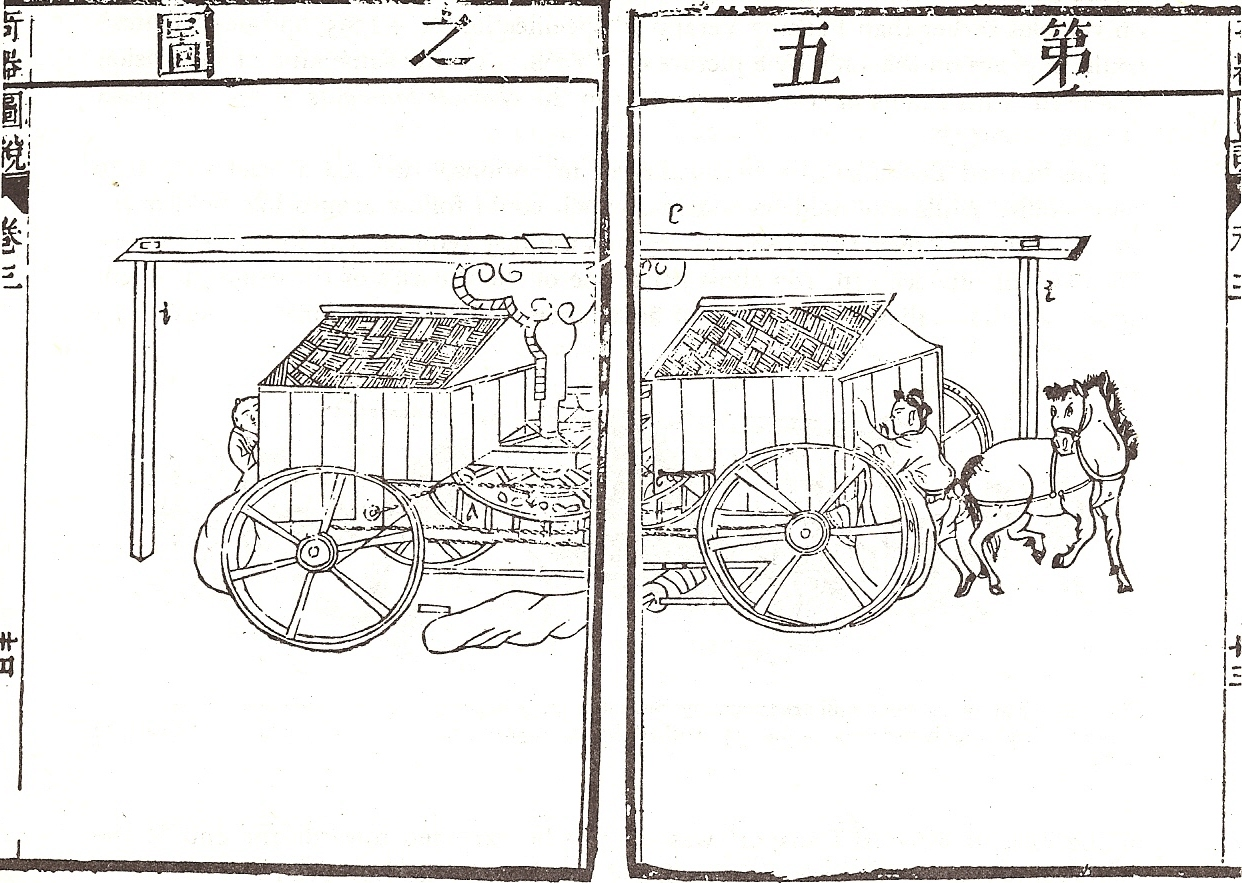
The field mill in the Chinese book Yuanxi Qiqi Tushuk Luzui (Collected Diagrams and Explanations of the Wonderful Machines of the Far West), by German Jesuit Johann Schreck and Wang Zheng, 1627

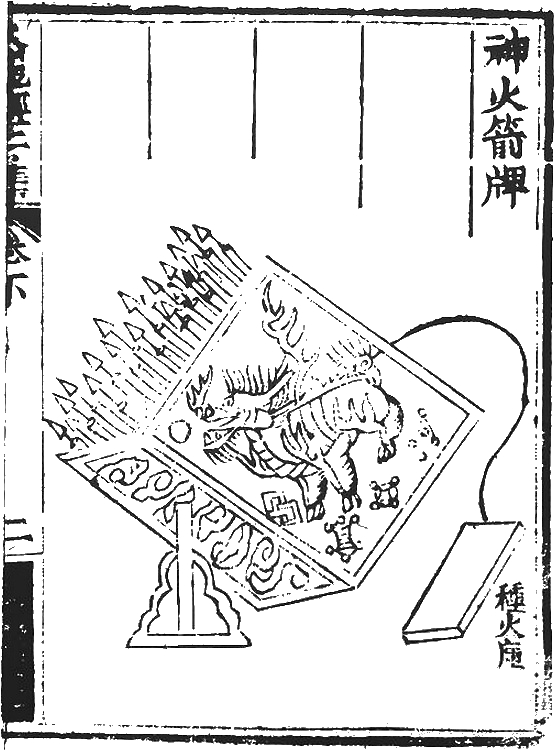
The divine fire arrow screen from the Huolongjing. A stationary arrow launcher that carries one hundred fire arrows. It is activated by a trap-like mechanism, possibly of wheellock design.

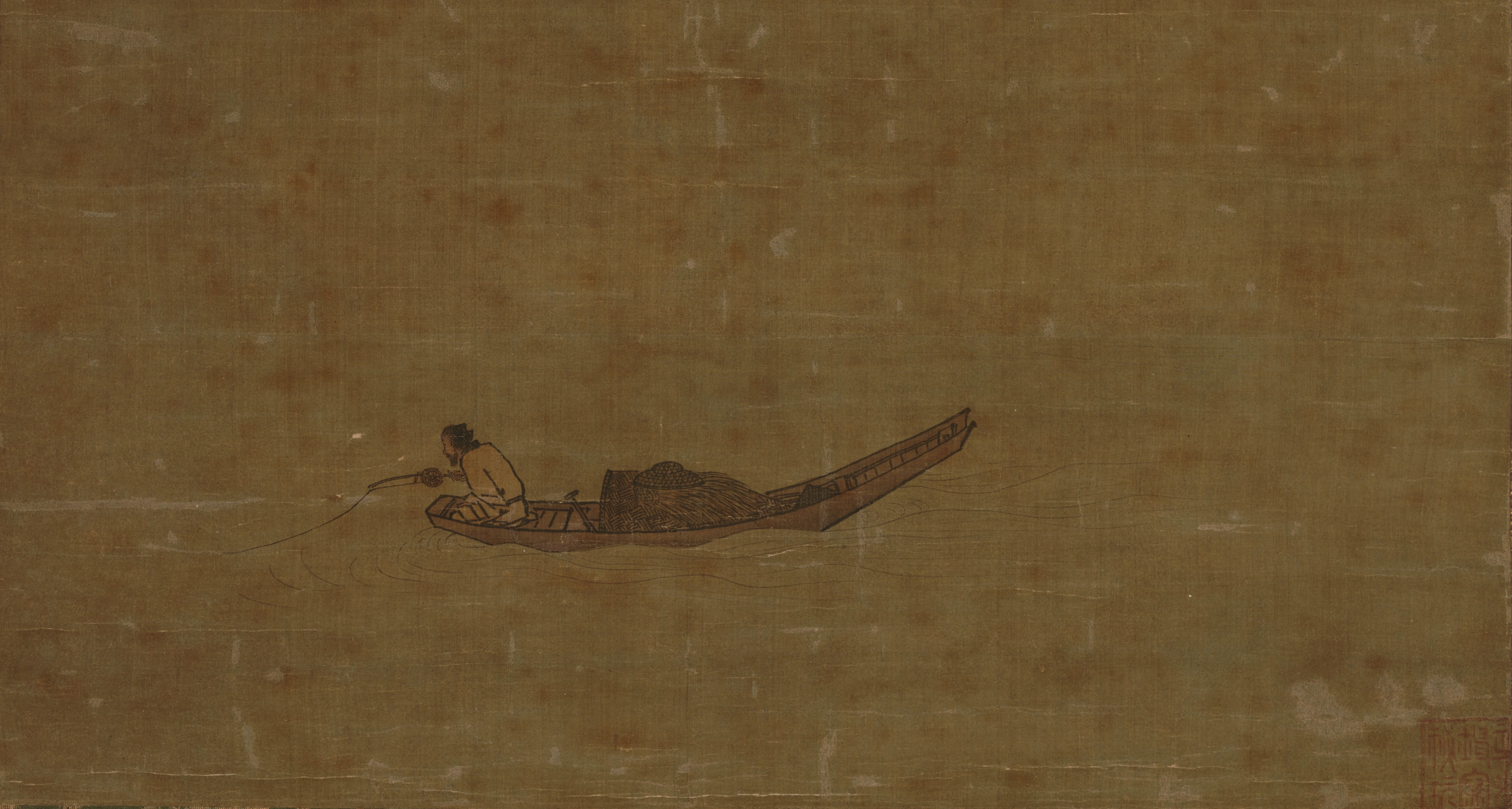
"Angler on a Wintry Lake", painted in 1195 by Song dynasty painter Ma Yuan, featuring the oldest known depiction of a fishing reel

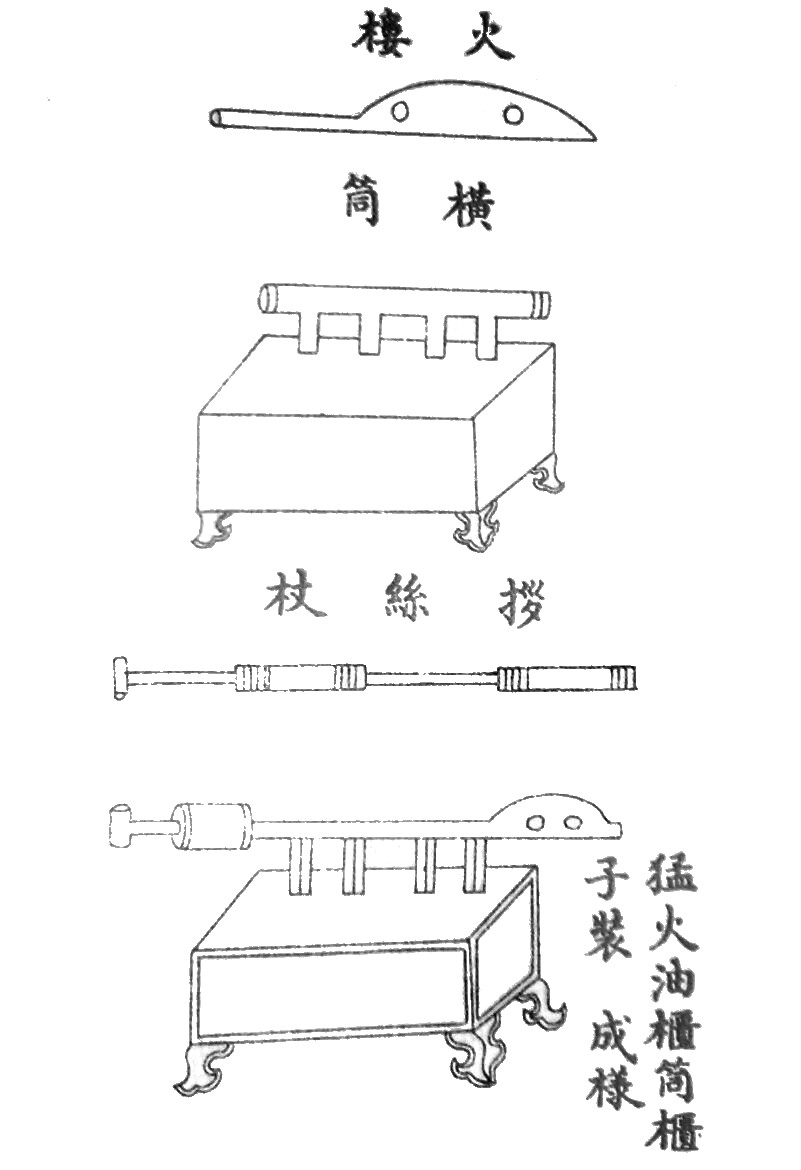
Chinese flamethrower from the Wujing Zongyao manuscript of 1044, Song dynasty

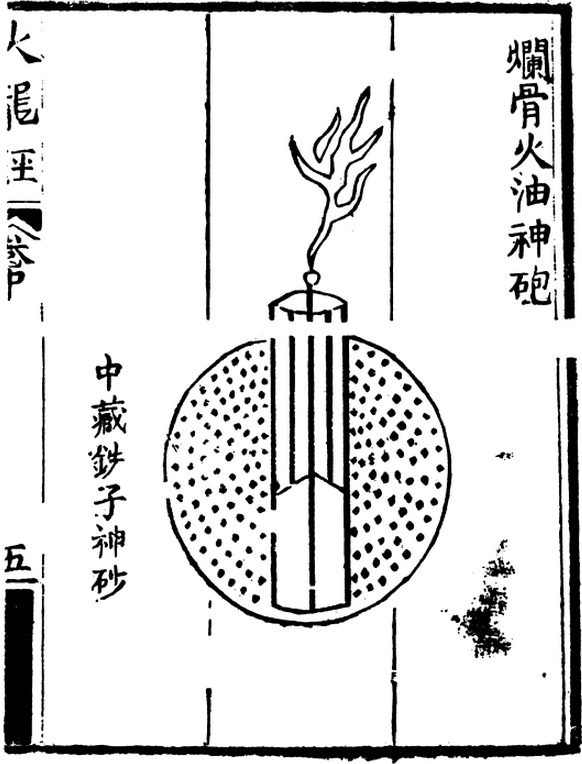
An illustration of a fragmentation bomb from the 14th century Ming dynasty text Huolongjing. The black dots represent iron pellets.

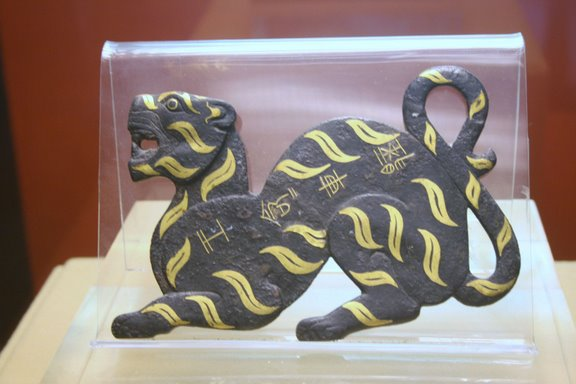
Tiger tally of the Western Han period

- Field mill: In the Yezhongji ('Record of Affairs at the Capital Ye of the Later Zhao Dynasty') written by Lu Hui (fl. 350 AD), various mechanical devices are described which were invented by two Later Zhao (319–351) engineers known as Xie Fei, a palace officer, and Wei Mengbian, Director of the Imperial Workshops. One of these is the field mill, which was essentially a cart with millstones placed onto the frame; these were mechanically rotated by the movement of the cart's terrain wheels in order to grind wheat and other cereal crops. A similar vehicle these two invented was the pounding cart, which had wooden statues mounted on the top which were actually mechanical figures who operated real tilt hammers in order to hull rice; again, the device only functioned when the cart was moved forward and the wheels turned. The field mill lost its use in China sometime after the Later Zhao, but it was invented separately in Europe in 1580 by the Italian military engineer Pompeo Targone. It was featured in a treatise by the Italian engineer and writer Vittorio Zonca in 1607, and then in a Chinese book of 1627 (concerning European technology) that was compiled and translated by the German Jesuit polymath Johann Schreck (1576–1630) and the Ming dynasty (1368–1644) Chinese author Wang Zheng (王徵; 1571–1644), although by then it was considered by the Chinese to be an original Western contraption.
- Finery forge: In addition to accidental lumps of low-carbon wrought iron produced by excessive injected air in Chinese cupola furnaces, the ancient Chinese also created wrought iron by using the finery forge at least by the 2nd century BC, the earliest specimens of cast and pig iron fined into wrought iron and steel found at the early Han dynasty (202 BC – 220 AD) site at Tieshenggou. Pigott speculates that the finery forge existed in the previous Warring States period (403–221 BC), because there are wrought iron items from China dating from that period and there is no documented evidence that the bloomery was ever used in China. The fining process involved liquifying cast iron in a fining hearth and removing carbon from the molten cast iron through oxidation. Wagner writes that, in addition to the Han dynasty hearths, believed to be fining hearths, there is also pictorial evidence of the fining hearth from a Shandong tomb mural dated to the 1st or 2nd century AD, along with a hint of written evidence in a Daoist text from the 4th century AD, Taiping Jing.
- Fire arrow: One of the earliest weaponized forms of gunpowder was the fire arrow which received its name from the translated Chinese term huǒjiàn (火箭), which literally means fire arrow. In China a fire arrow referred to a gunpowder projectile consisting of a bag of incendiary gunpowder attached to the shaft of an arrow from the 9th century onward. Later on solid fuel rockets utilizing gunpowder were used to provide arrows with propulsive force and the term fire arrow became synonymous with rocket in the Chinese language. In other languages such as Sanskrit, fire arrow (agni astra) underwent a different semantic shift and became synonymous with cannon. Fire arrows are the predecessors of fire lances, the first firearm.
- Firecracker: The predecessor of the firecracker was a type of heated bamboo, used as early as 200 BC, that exploded when heated continuously. The Chinese name for firecrackers, baozhu, literally means 'exploding bamboo'. After the invention of gunpowder, gunpowder firecrackers had a shape that resembled bamboo and produced a similar sound, so the name "exploding bamboo" was retained. In traditional Chinese culture, firecrackers were used to scare off evil spirits.
- Fire lance: The fire lance was a proto-gun developed in the 10th century with a tube of first bamboo and later on metal that shot a weak gunpowder blast of flame and shrapnel; its earliest representation comes from a painting found at Dunhuang. The earliest confirmed employment of the fire lance in warfare was by Song dynasty forces against the Jin in 1132 during the siege of De'an (modern Anlu, Hubei Province), where they were used to great effect against wooden siege towers called "sky bridges": "As the sky bridges became stuck fast, more than ten feet from the walls and unable to get any closer, [the defenders] were ready. From below and above the defensive structures they emerged and attacked with fire lances, striking lances, and hooked sickles, each in turn. The people [i.e., the porters] at the base of the sky bridges were repulsed. Pulling their bamboo ropes, they [the porters] ended up drawing the sky bridge back in an anxious and urgent rush, going about fifty paces before stopping." The surviving porters then tried once again to wheel the sky bridges into place but Song soldiers emerged from the walls in force and made a direct attack on the sky bridge soldiers while defenders on the walls threw bricks and shot arrows in conjunction with trebuchets hurling bombs and rocks. The sky bridges were also set fire to with incendiary bundles of grass and firewood. Li Heng, the Jin commander, decided to lift the siege and Jin forces were driven back with severe casualties.
- Fireworks: Fireworks first appeared in China during the Song dynasty (960–1279), in the early age of gunpowder. The common people in the Song era could purchase simple fireworks from market vendors; these were made of sticks of bamboo packed with gunpowder, although grander displays were known to be held. Rocket propulsion was soon applied to warfare, and by the time of the mid 14th century there were many types of rocket launchers available.
- Fishing reel: In literary records, the earliest evidence of the fishing reel comes from a 4th-century AD work entitled Lives of Famous Immortals. The earliest known depiction of a fishing reel comes from a Southern Song (1127–1279) painting done in 1195 by Song dynasty painter Ma Yuan (c. 1160–1225) called "Angler on a Wintry Lake", showing a man sitting on a small sampan boat and casting out his fishing line. Another fishing reel was featured in a painting by the Yuan dynasty painter Wu Zhen (1280–1354). The book Tianzhu lingqian (Holy Lections from Indian Sources), printed between 1208 and 1224, features two different woodblock print illustrations of fishing reels being used. An Armenian parchment Gospel of the 13th century shows a reel (though not as clearly depicted as the Chinese ones). The Sancai Tuhui, a Chinese encyclopedia published in 1609, features the next known picture of a fishing reel and vividly shows the windlass pulley of the device. These five pictures mentioned are the only ones which feature fishing reels before the year 1651 (when the first English illustration was made); after that year they became commonly depicted in world art.
- Flamethrower, double piston and gunpowder-activated: Although the single piston flamethrower was first developed in the Byzantine Empire during the 7th century, the 10th-century Chinese flamethrower, or Pen Huo Qi, boasted a continuous stream of flame by employing double piston syringes (which had been known since the Han dynasty) spouting Greek fire which had been imported from China's maritime trade contacts in the Middle East. It was first used in battle 932 during the Five Dynasties and Ten Kingdoms period (907–960), and the earliest illustration is found in the early Song dynasty military manuscript Wujing Zongyao of 1044, which also described the device in full. Unlike the Greek model which employed a furnace, the Pen Huo Qi was ignited by an incendiary gunpowder fuse.
- Flare: The earliest recorded use of gunpowder for signalling purposes was the signal bomb used by the Song dynasty Chinese as the Mongol-led Yuan dynasty besieged Yangzhou in 1276. These soft-shelled bombs, timed to explode in mid-air, were used to send messages to a detachment of troops far in the distance. Another mention of the signal bomb appears in a text dating from 1293, requesting their collection from those still stored in Zhejiang. A signal gun appears in Korea by 1600. The Wu I Thu Phu Thung Chih or Illustrated Military Encyclopedia written in 1791 depicts a signal gun in an illustration.
- Folding screen: The folding screen is a type of furniture consisting of several frames or panels. Screens date from China during the Eastern Zhou dynasty period (771–256 BC). These were initially one-panel screens in contrast to folding screens. Folding screens were invented during the Han dynasty (206 BC - AD 220). Depictions of those folding screens have been found in Han dynasty era tombs, such as one in Zhucheng, Shandong Province. During the Tang dynasty, folding screens were considered ideal ornaments for many painters to display their paintings and calligraphy on. Many artists painted on paper or silk and applied it onto the folding screen. The landscape paintings on folding screens reached its height during the Song dynasty (960–1279).
- Forensic entomology: The Song dynasty (960–1279) forensic science book Collected Cases of Injustice Rectified published by the Song dynasty court judge, physician, medical scientist and writer Song Ci in 1247 contains the oldest known case of forensic entomology. In a murder case of 1235, a villager was stabbed to death and authorities determined that his wounds were inflicted by a sickle; this was a tool used for cutting rice at harvest time, a fact which led them to suspect a fellow peasant worker was involved. The local magistrate had the villagers assemble in the town square where they would temporarily relinquish their sickles. Within minutes, a mass of blow flies gathered around one sickle and none other, attracted to the scent of traces of blood unseen by the naked eye. It became apparent to all that the owner of that sickle was the culprit, the latter pleading for mercy as he was detained by authorities.
- Fragmentation bomb: The use of fragmentation in bombs dates from the 14th century, and first appears in the Ming dynasty text Huolongjing. The fragmentation bombs were filled with iron pellets and pieces of broken porcelain. A heated mixture of salammoniac, tung oil, chin chih, scallion juice, and yin hsiu is poured into the bomb, coating the pellets. Once the bomb explodes, the resulting shrapnel is capable of piercing the skin and blinding enemy soldiers.
- Free reed aerophone: The musical pipe organ employing metal piston bellows had a long history in the Western world, dating from the Hellenistic period. However, the Western pipe organ did not make use of the reed, which the ancient Chinese mouth organ employed. The latter instrument, called a sheng and made traditionally of bamboo pipes, was first mentioned in the Shi Jing of the Zhou dynasty (c. 1050–256 BC). The Chinese sheng is considered the ancestor of the harmonica, harmonium, concertina, accordion, and all other reed organ instruments. A free reed organ was invented in the Arab world in the 13th century, and the German organ builder Heinrich Traxdorf (fl. 15th century) of Nuremberg built one about 1460. It is thought that the classical Chinese sheng travelled west through Russia during the 19th century, as it was described then in Saint Petersburg.
- Fuse: Documented evidence suggests that the earliest fuses were first used by the Chinese between the 10th and 12th centuries. After the Chinese had invented gunpowder, they began adapting its explosive properties for use in military technology. By 1044 they were using gunpowder in simple grenades, bombs, and flamethrowers, all of which required a fuse to be lit before being thrown at the enemy.

=== G ===
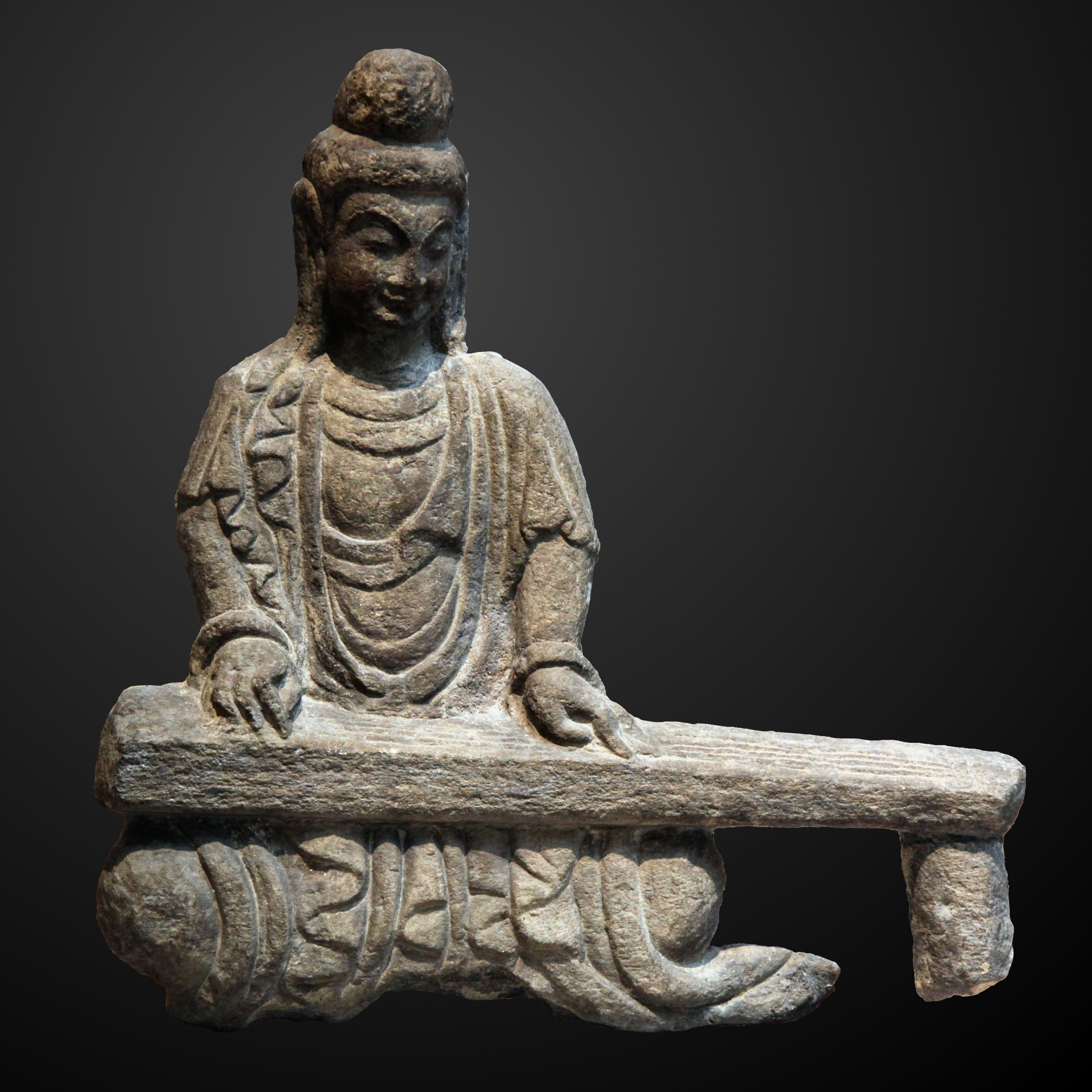
Rock carving of a bodhisattva playing a guqin, Northern Wei dynasty (386–534 AD)

- Gas cylinder: The world's first natural gas cylinders were invented in China during the medieval Tang dynasty where the Chinese drilled deep boreholes to retrieve natural gas and used airtight jointed bamboo pipes to collect and transport it for many miles to towns and villages.
- Gas lighting: The ancient Chinese during the Spring and Autumn period made the first practical use of natural gas for lighting purposes about 500 BC where they used bamboo pipelines to transport and carry both brine and natural gas for many miles to towns and villages.
- Gaussian elimination: The Chinese solved a system of linear equations. The rectangle of coefficients was reduced to triangular and then diagonal form, in a process identical to what Europeans would later call Gaussian elimination.
- Go (board game) (圍棋; wéiqí): Although ancient Chinese legend (perhaps contrived during the Han dynasty) has it that the mythological ruler Yao came down to earth from the Heavens about 2200 BC carrying with him a go board and stone player's pieces, it is known from existing literature that the go board game existed since at least the 10th century BC during the Zhou dynasty (c. 1050–256 BC) and was even mentioned in writing by ancient Chinese philosophers Confucius (551–479 BC) and Mencius (371–289 BC), although the latter two had a slightly negative opinion of it.
- Goldfish domestication: In ancient China, various species of carp (collectively known as Asian carps) were domesticated and have been reared as food fish for thousands of years. Some of these normally gray or silver species have a tendency to produce red, orange or yellow color mutations; this was first recorded in the Jin dynasty (266–420). During the Tang dynasty (618–907), it was popular to raise carp in ornamental ponds and water gardens. A natural genetic mutation produced gold (actually yellowish orange) rather than silver coloration. People began to breed the gold variety instead of the silver variety, keeping them in ponds or other bodies of water. Goldfish were introduced into Europe during the 17th century, and into North America in the 19th century.

=== H ===
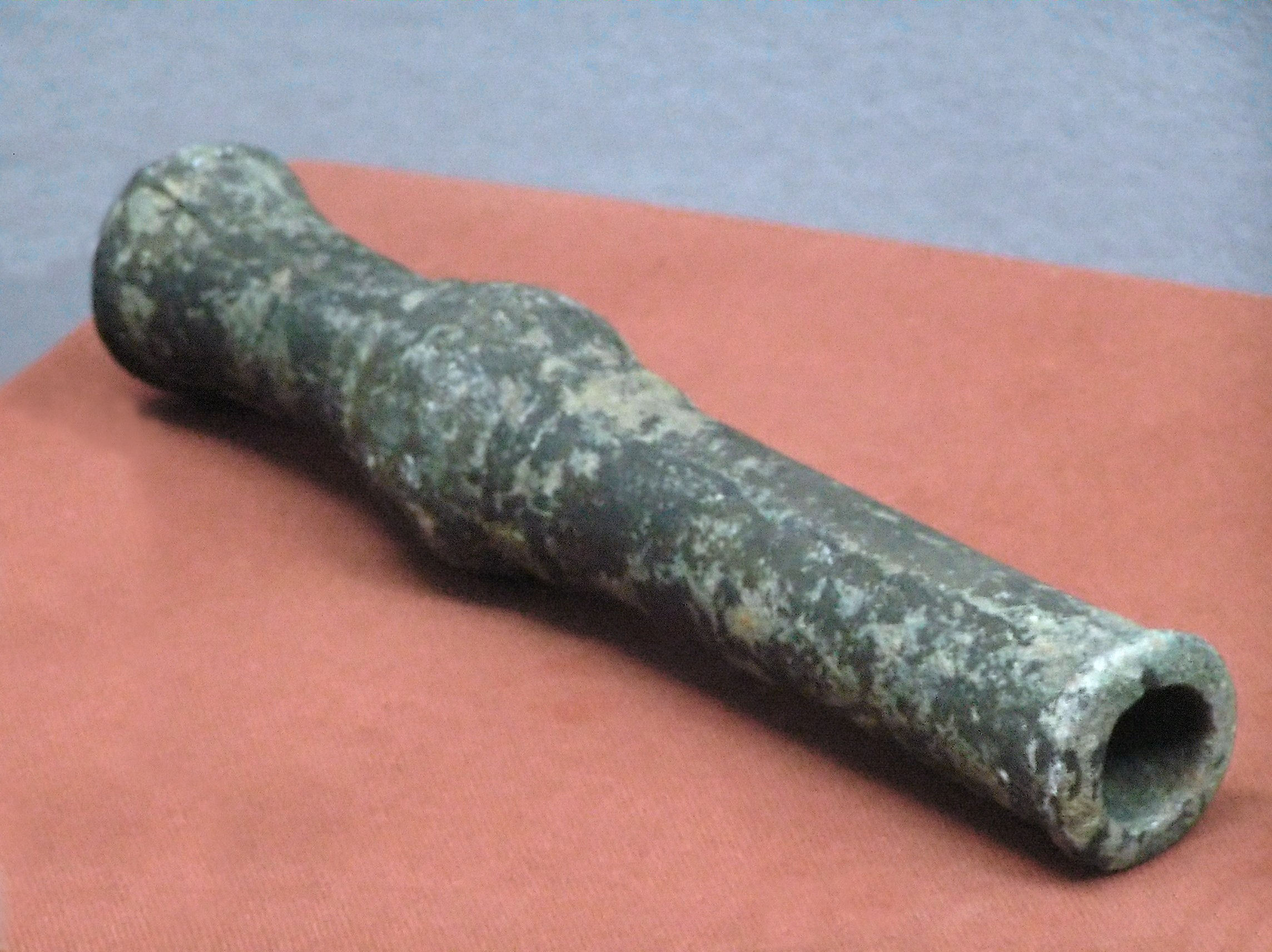
A bronze hand cannon from the Yuan dynasty (1271–1368), one of the oldest in the world; the oldest specimen dates from about 1288, when the first textual reference to the hand cannon appears in Chinese literature.

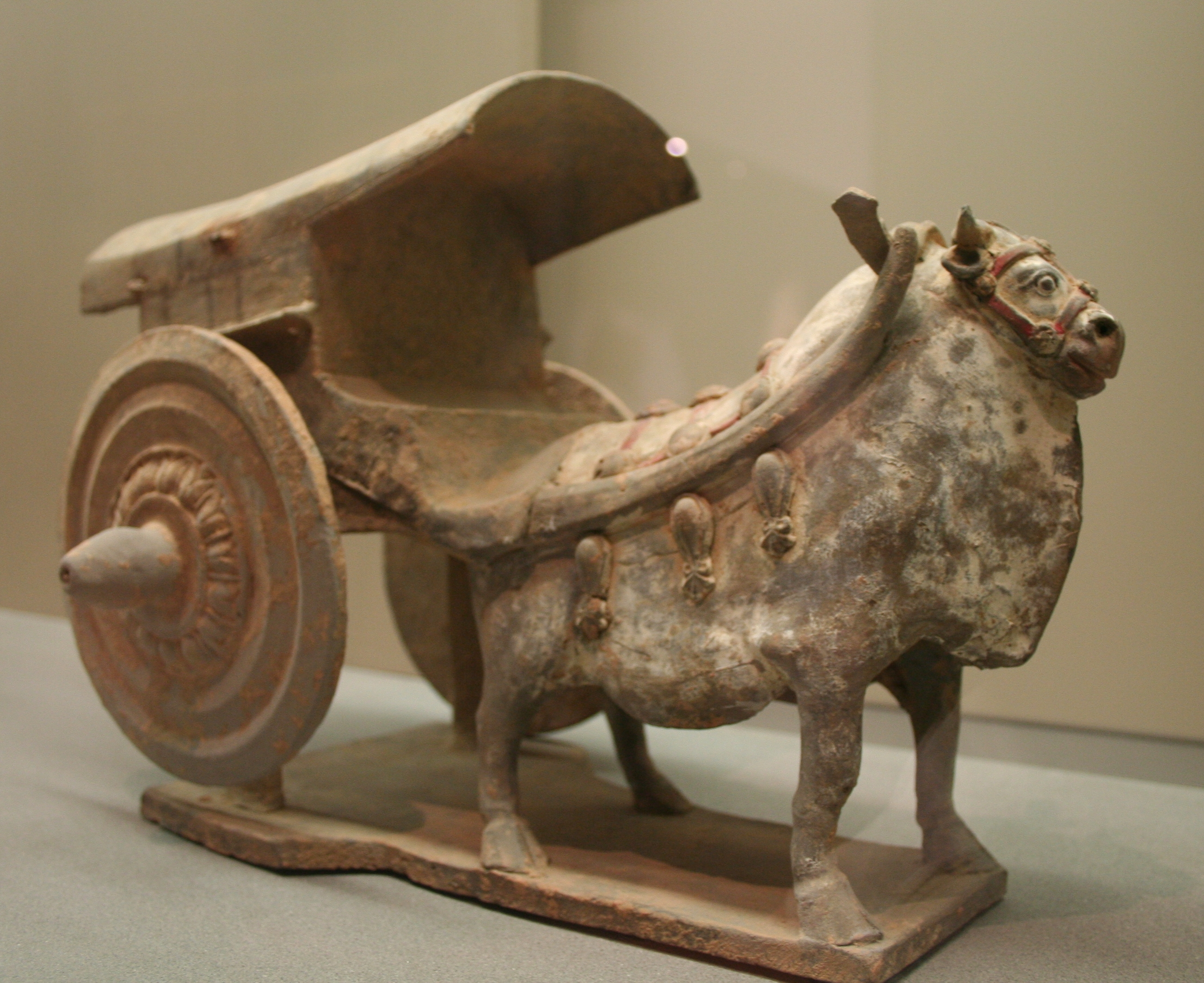
A Sui dynasty (581–618 AD) plough figurine pulled by a bull

- Hand cannon: The bronze Yuan dynasty gun from Heilongjiang, which dates from about 1288, is a little over 0.3 m (0.98 ft) long and weighs 3.6 kg (7.9 lb). It has a small touch hole for ignition and an even bore except for the bulbous enlargement around the explosion chamber. It was excavated with a bronze pan, mirror and vase.
- Hand grenade, explosive: Before explosive grenades, incendiary grenades were used by the Eastern Roman Empire, incorporating Greek fire. Early prototypes to the modern explosive grenade, according to Needham, appear in the military book, Wujing Zongyao ("Compilation of Military Classics"), by 1044. During the Song dynasty, weapons known as Zhen Tian Lei were created when Chinese soldiers packed gunpowder into ceramic or metal containers and thrown at the enemy. Further descriptions and illustrations of early Chinese hand grenades are provided in the Huolongjing.
- Hand gun: An early depiction of a hand gun is a sculpture from a cave in Sichuan, dating from 1128, that portrays a figure carrying a vase-shaped bombard, firing flames and a cannonball. However, the oldest existent archaeological discovery of a metal barrel hand gun is the Heilongjiang hand cannon from the Chinese Heilongjiang excavation, dated to 1288. Handheld firearms first appeared in China where gunpowder was first developed. They were hand cannons (although they were not necessarily fired from the hand, but rather at the end of a handle). By the 14th century, they existed in Europe as well. The first handheld firearms that might better be called "pistols" were made as early as the 15th century, but their creator is unknown.
- Handscroll: The handscroll originated from ancient Chinese text documents. From the Spring and Autumn period (770–481 BC) through the Han dynasty (206 BC – 220 AD), bamboo or wooden slips were bound and used to write texts on. During the Eastern Han period (25–220), the use of paper and silk as handscrolls became more common. The handscroll was one of the main formats for texts up until the Tang dynasty (618–907). Since the Three Kingdoms (220–280), the handscroll became a standard form for mounting artwork. New styles were developed over time.
- Hanging scroll: Hanging scrolls originated in their earliest form from literature and other texts written on bamboo strips and silk banners in ancient China. The earliest hanging scrolls are related to and developed from silk banners in early Chinese history. These banners were long and hung vertically on walls. Such silk banners and hanging scroll paintings were found at Mawangdui, dating from the Han dynasty (206 BC – AD 220). By the time of the Tang dynasty (618–907), the aesthetic and structural objectives for hanging scrolls were summarized, which are still followed to this day. During the early Song dynasty (960–1279), the scrolls became well suited to the art styles of the artists, consequently hanging scrolls were made in many different sizes and proportions.
- Hell money: Hell money is a form of joss paper printed to resemble fake legal tender bank notes. The notes are not an official form of recognized currency or legal tender since their sole intended purpose is to be offered as burnt offerings to the deceased as a superstitious solution to resolve their ancestors financial problems. This custom has been practiced by the modern Chinese and across East Asia since the late 19th century.
- Hill censer: The hill censer, a vessel used for burning incense, dates from the Han dynasty (206 BC – AD 220). The censers are shaped like mountains and were used for religious rituals. The shape of the hill censer acts as a visual aid for envisioning the sacred mountains that were said to have been inhabited by Daoist immortals. Hill censers were originally designed for Daoist rituals, but were later used by Chinese Buddhists. Hill censers often include carvings of wilds animals and birds. Some censers depict waves at the foundation of the vessel, said to be the waves of the East China Sea. A hole at the top of the censer releases the smoke of the incense.
- Horse collar: A significant improvement of the ancient breast harness was the horse collar. The horse collar was depicted in a Northern Wei (386–534) mural at Dunhuang, China, dated 477–499; the latter artwork does not feature the essential collar cushion behind the cross bar, though, and a later Tang dynasty (618–907) mural, from about 851, accurately shows the cushioned collar behind the cross bar. An earlier painting of the Sui dynasty (581–618) accurately depicted the horse collar as it is seen today, yet the illustration shows its use on a camel instead of a horse.
- Horse harness: Throughout the ancient world, the throat-and-girth harness was used for harnessing horses that pulled carts; this greatly limited a horse's ability to exert itself as it was constantly choked at the neck. A painting on a lacquerware box from the State of Chu, dated to the 4th century BC, shows the first known use of a yoke placed across a horse's chest, with traces connecting to the chariot shaft. The hard yoke across the horse's chest was gradually replaced by a breast strap, which was often depicted in carved reliefs and stamped bricks of tombs from the Han dynasty (202 BC – 220 AD). Eventually, the horse collar was invented in China, at least by the 5th century.
- Hygrometer: Prototype hygrometers were devised and developed in the hills during the Western Han dynasty in Ancient China to elucidate mechanisms of long-range meteorological fluctuations. The Chinese used a bar of charcoal and a lump of earth: its dry weight was taken and then compared with its damp weight after being exposed in the air. The differences in weight was used to tally the humidity level. Other techniques were applied using mass to measure humidity such as when the air was dry, the bar of charcoal would be light while the air was humid, the bar of charcoal would be heavy. By hanging a lump of earth and a bar of charcoal on the two ends of a staff separately and adding a fixated lifting string on the middle point to make the staff horizontal in dry air, an ancient hygrometer was made.

=== I ===
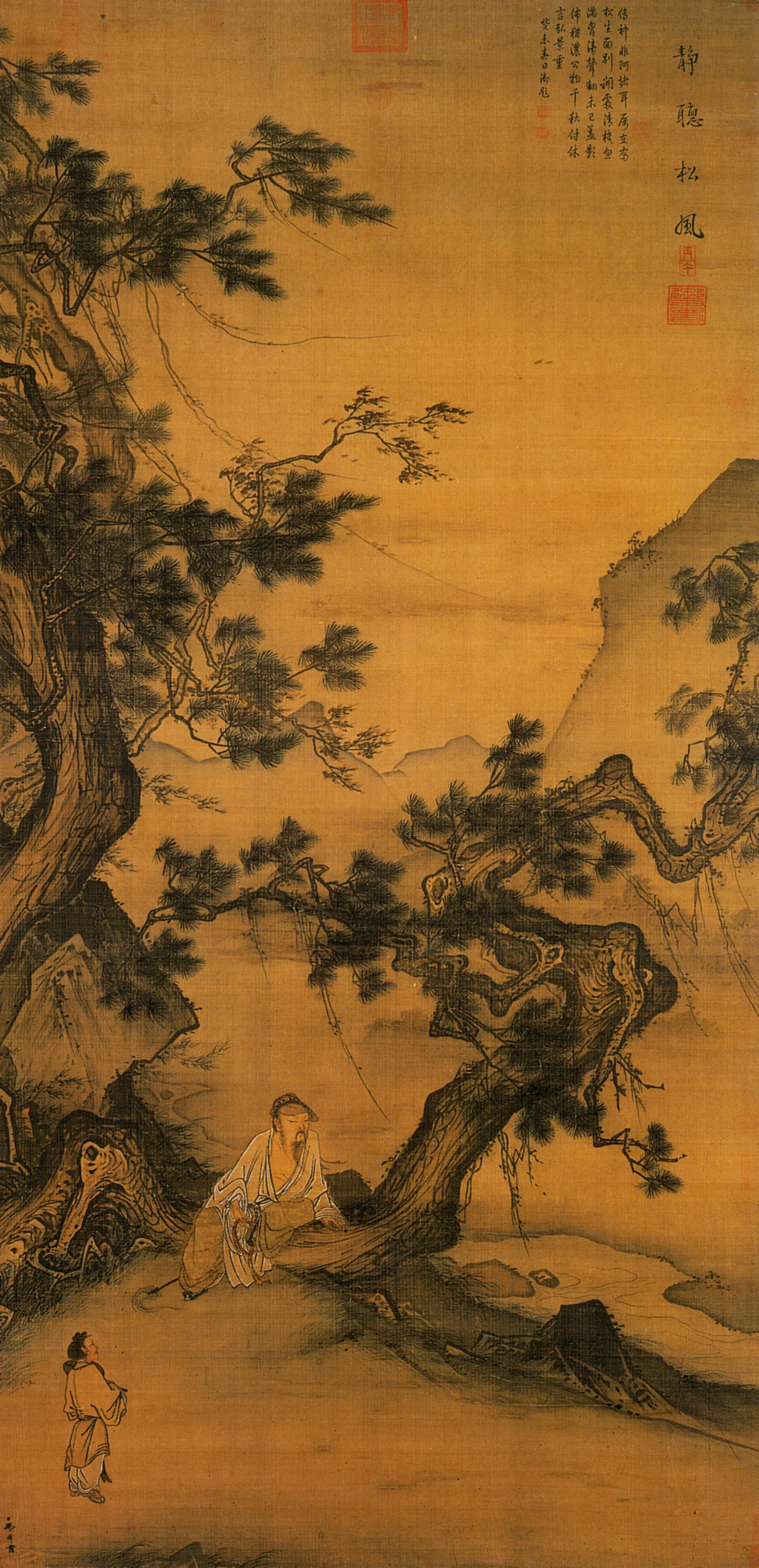
A Song painting by Ma Lin, dated 1246, using India ink on silk

- Incense clock: Incense clocks originated in China during the 6th century and later made their way to Japan, with one example preserved in the Shōsōin. The earliest incense clocks, dating from the 6th to the 8th centuries CE, feature Devanāgarī carvings instead of Chinese seal characters. Historian Silvio Bedini asserts that these carvings were based on seals referenced in Tantric Buddhist scriptures, which were translated from Indian scriptures into Chinese. However, the time-telling associated with these seals was designed and incorporated by the Chinese.
- India ink: Although named after carbonaceous pigment materials originating from India, India ink first appeared in China; some scholars say it was made as far back as the 3rd millennium BC, and others state it was perhaps not invented until the Wei dynasty (AD 220–265).
- Inkstone: The inkstone is a stone mortar used in Chinese calligraphy for grinding and mixing ink. Other than stone, inkstones are also manufactured from clay, bronze, iron, and porcelain. The device evolved from a rubbing tool used for rubbing dyes, from 6000–7000 years ago. The earliest excavated inkstone is dated to the 3rd century BC, and was discovered in a tomb in modern Yunmeng, Hubei. Use of the inkstone was popularized during the Han dynasty.
- Inoculation: As Europeans would not begin to develop vaccinations for smallpox until 1796, historical Chinese records show that Chinese physicians have been inoculating against the same disease hundreds of years earlier. Needham states that a case of inoculation for smallpox may have existed in the late 10th century during the Song dynasty (960–1279), yet they rely on the book Zhongdou xinfa (種痘心法) written in 1808 by Zhu Yiliang for this evidence. Wan Quan (1499–1582) wrote the first clear reference to smallpox inoculation in his Douzhen xinfa (痘疹心法) of 1549. The process of inoculation was also vividly described by Yu Chang in his Yuyi cao (寓意草), or Notes on My Judgment published in 1643, and Zhang Yan in his Zhongdou xinshu (種痘新書), or New book on smallpox inoculation in 1741. As written by Yu Tianchi in his Shadou jijie (痧痘集解) of 1727, which was based on Wang Zhangren's Douzhen jinjing lu (痘疹金鏡錄) of 1579, the technique of inoculation to avoid smallpox was not widespread in China until the reign of the Longqing Emperor (r. 1567 – 1572) during the Ming dynasty (1368–1644).

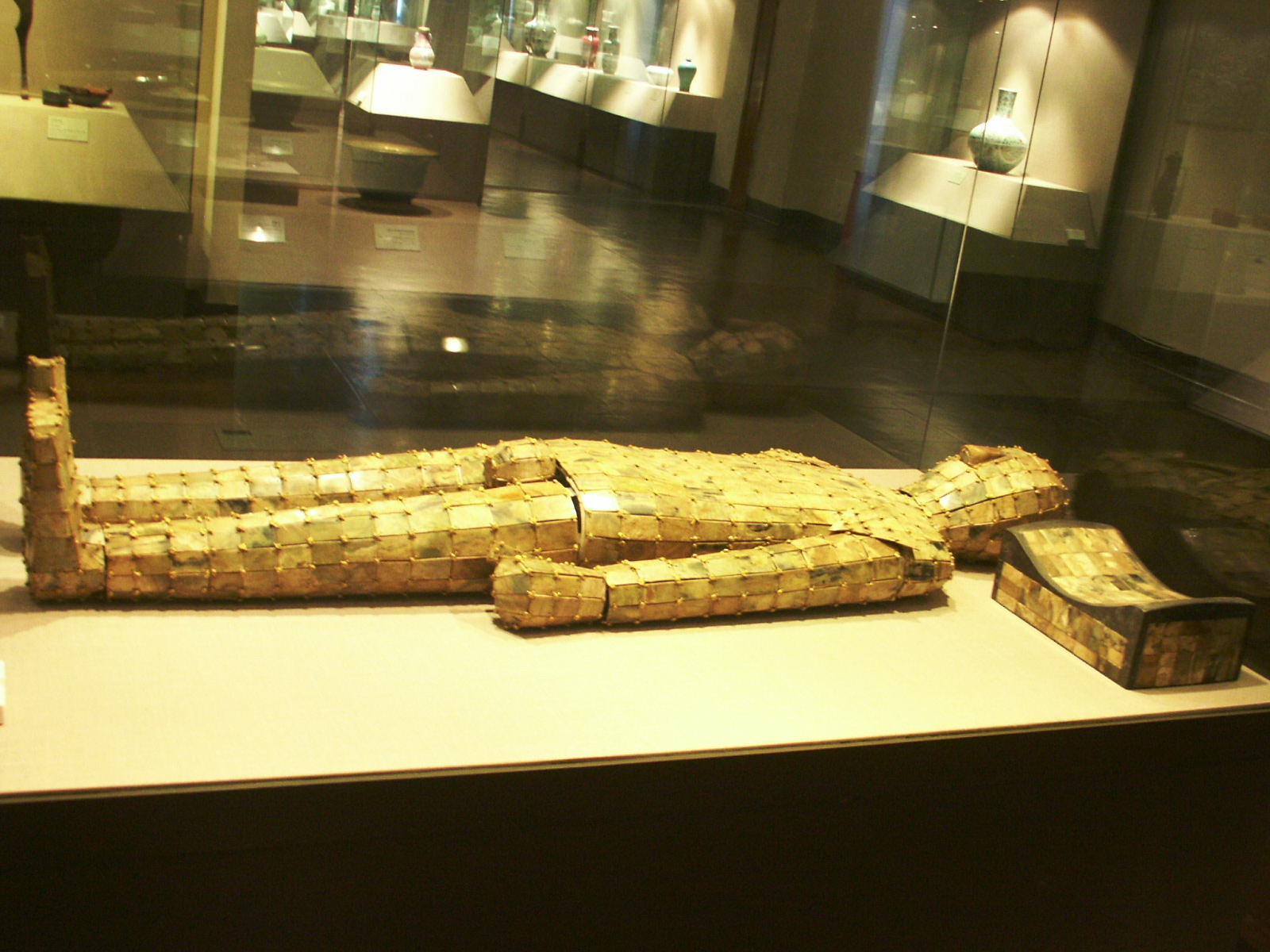
A jade burial suit from the Han dynasty (202 BC – 220 AD), at the Museum of Chinese History, Beijing

- Jade burial suit: Burial suits made of jade existed in China during the Han dynasty (202 BC – 220 AD). Confirming ancient records about Han royalty and nobility buried in jade burial suits, archaeologists discovered in June 1968 the tombs and jade burial suits of Prince Liu Sheng (d. 113 BC) and his wife Dou Wan in Hebei province. Liu's suit, in twelve flexible sections, comprised 2,690 square pieces of green jade with holes punctured in the four corners of each piece so that they could be sewn together with gold thread. The total weight of the gold thread used in his suit was 1,110 g (39 oz). Princess Dou Wan's suit had 2,156 pieces of jade stitched together with 703 g (24.8 oz) of gold thread. Although jade burial outer wears and head masks appear in tombs of the early Han dynasty, burial suits did not appear until the reign of Emperor Wen of Han (r. 180–157 BC), with the earliest being found in the Shizishan site. A total of 22 Western Han (202 BC – 9 AD) and 27 Eastern Han (25–220 AD) complete and partial jade burial suits were uncovered between 1954 and 1996. They are found mainly in Hebei, Shandong, Jiangsu and Henan, as well as at Yangjiawan, Dongyuan, Guangzhou, Mawangdui, Mianyang and Shizhaishan. The jade burial suit gradually disappeared when it was forbidden in 222 by Emperor Wen of Wei.

=== K ===
- Kite:The Chinese invented the kite about 3,000 years ago. One reason for this might be that China had many good materials for making kites. The Chinese made silk, which was used for sails.

=== L ===
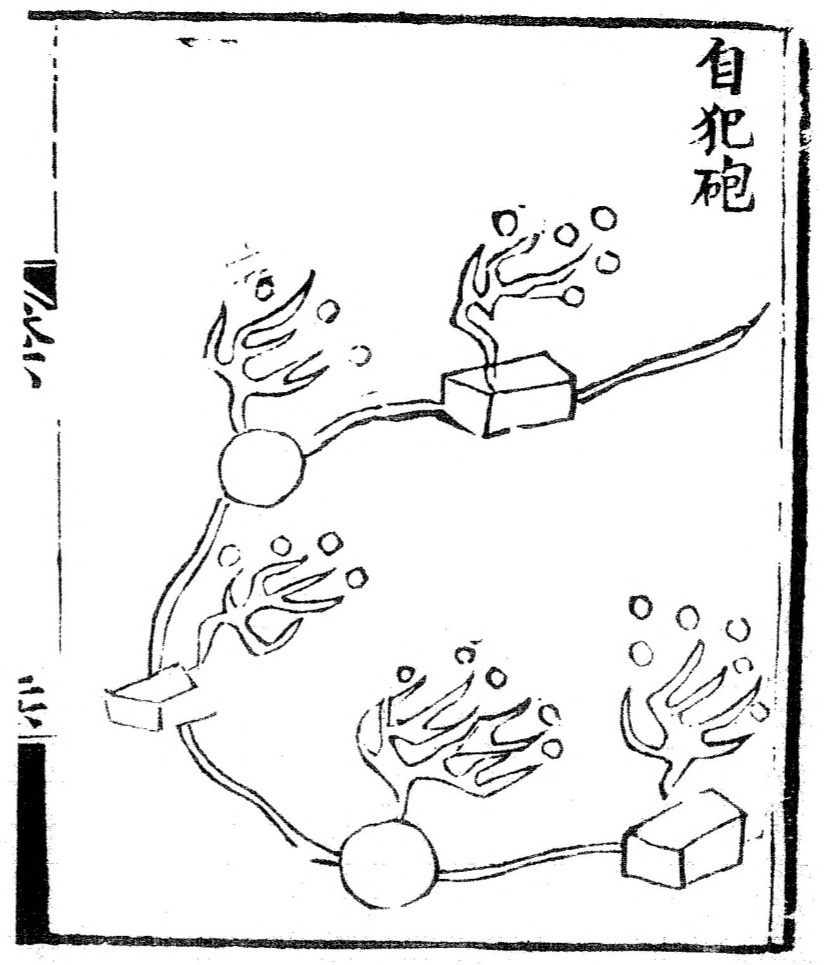
The 'self-tripped trespass land mine', from the Huolongjing, 14th century

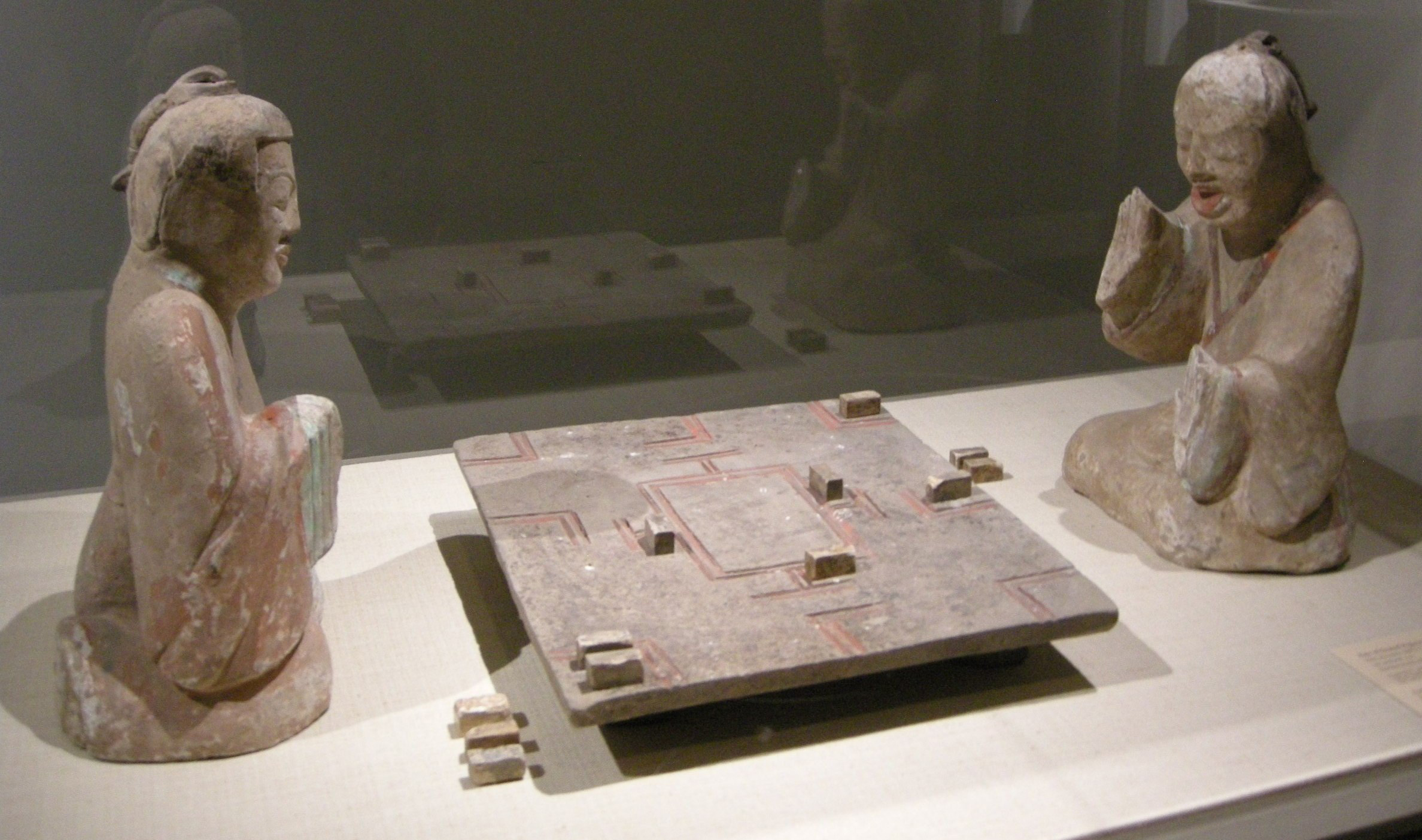
A pair of Eastern Han dynasty (25–220 AD) tomb statuettes playing the game liubo

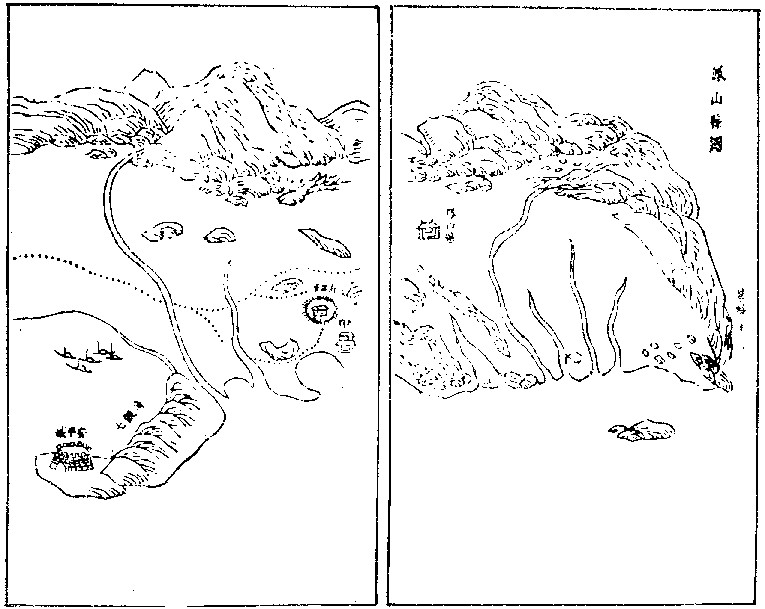
Example of a Chinese printed map in a gazetteer, showing Fengshan County of Taiwan Prefecture, published in 1696; the first known printed map from China comes from a Song dynasty (960–1279) encyclopedia of the 12th century

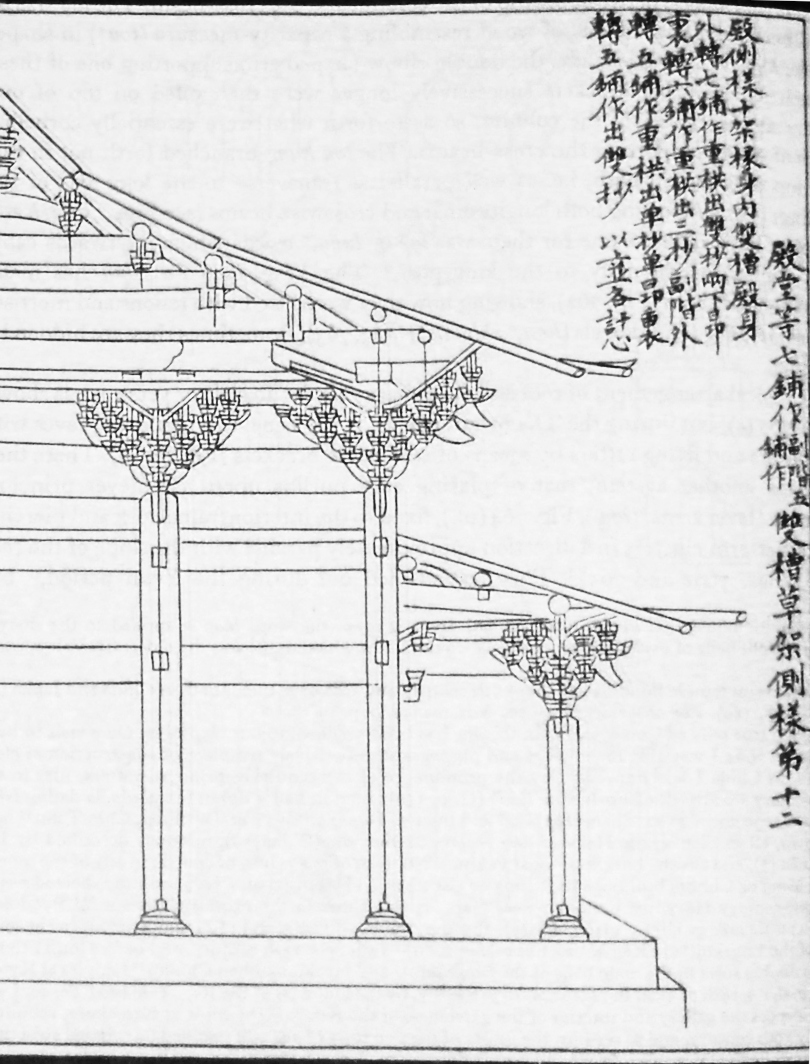
A cross section of a Chinese hall, from the Yingzao Fashi architectural treatise published by Li Jie in 1103, during the Song dynasty (960–1279); this book explicitly laid out an eight-graded modular system of architecture for timber halls and pavilions of different sizes

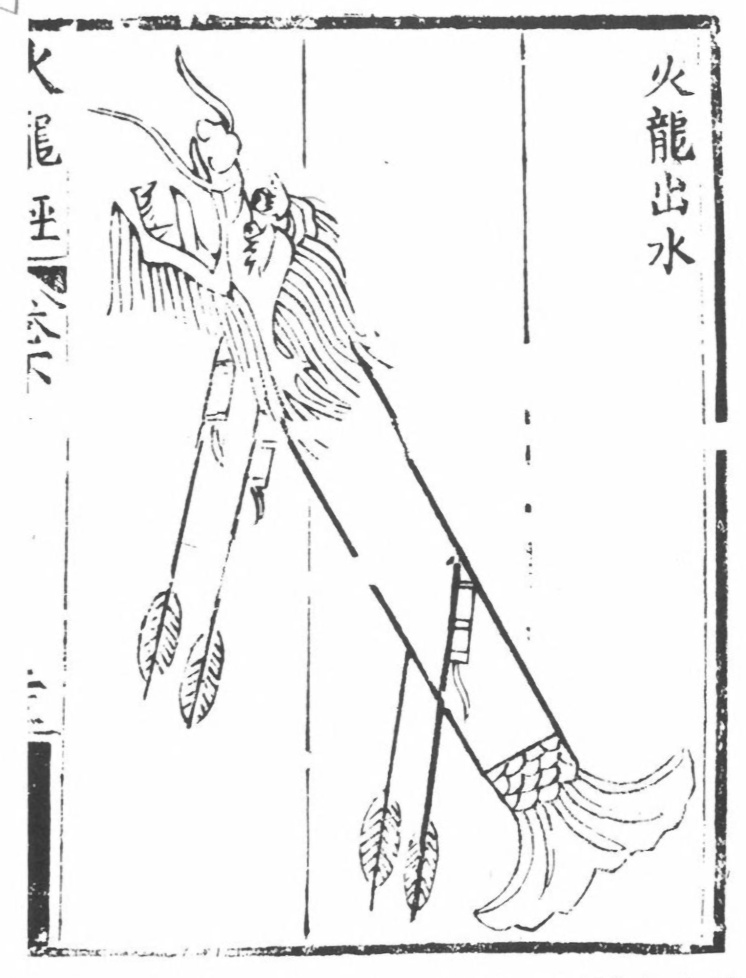
A multistage rocket from the 14th-century military manuscript Huolongjing, Ming dynasty

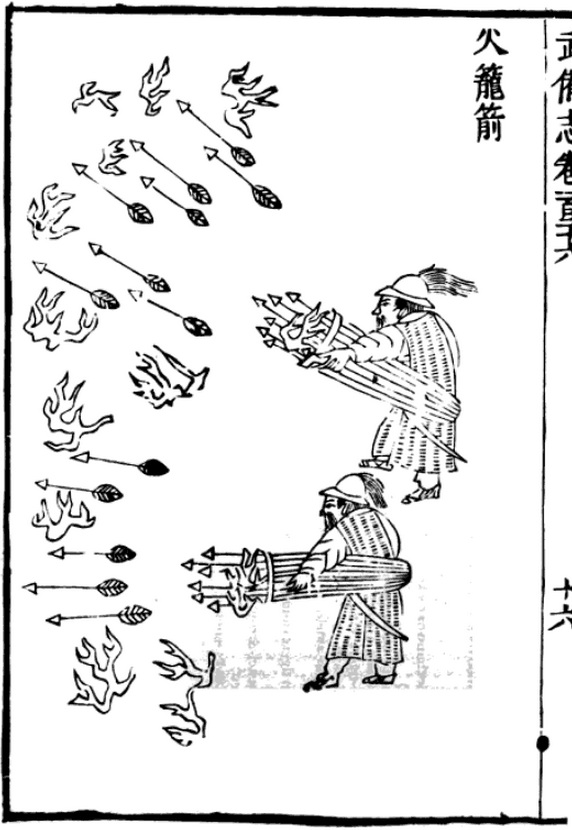
An illustration of a handheld portable multiple rocket launcher as depicted in the 11th century book Wujing Zongyao of the Song dynasty. The launcher is constructed using basketry.

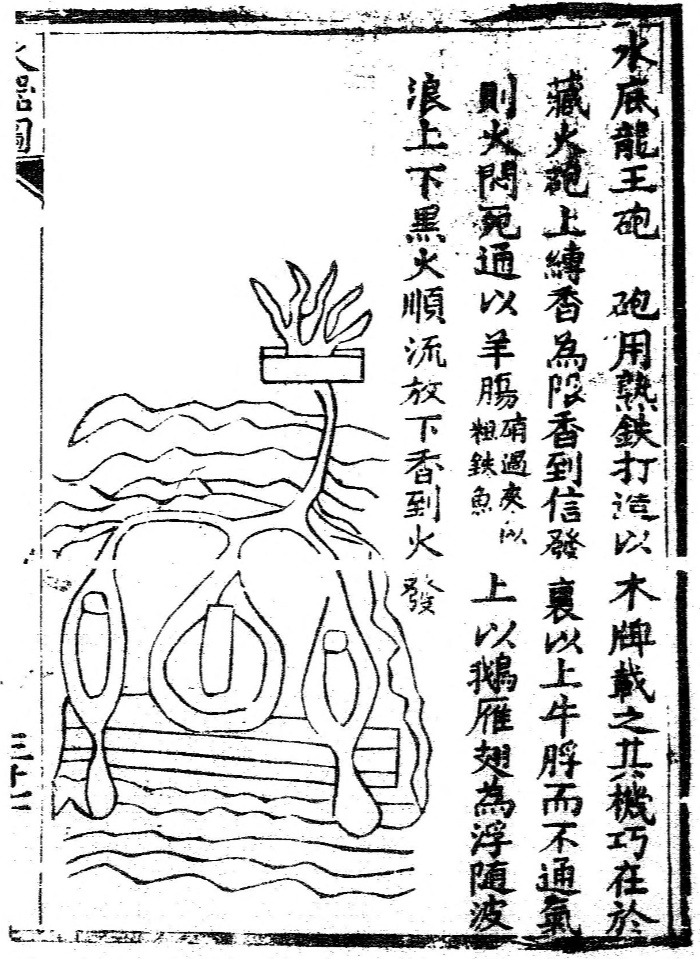
A naval mine from the Huolongjing, mid-14th century

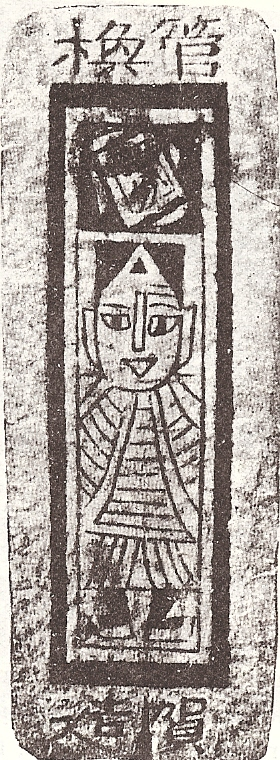
Chinese playing card dated about AD 1400, Ming dynasty

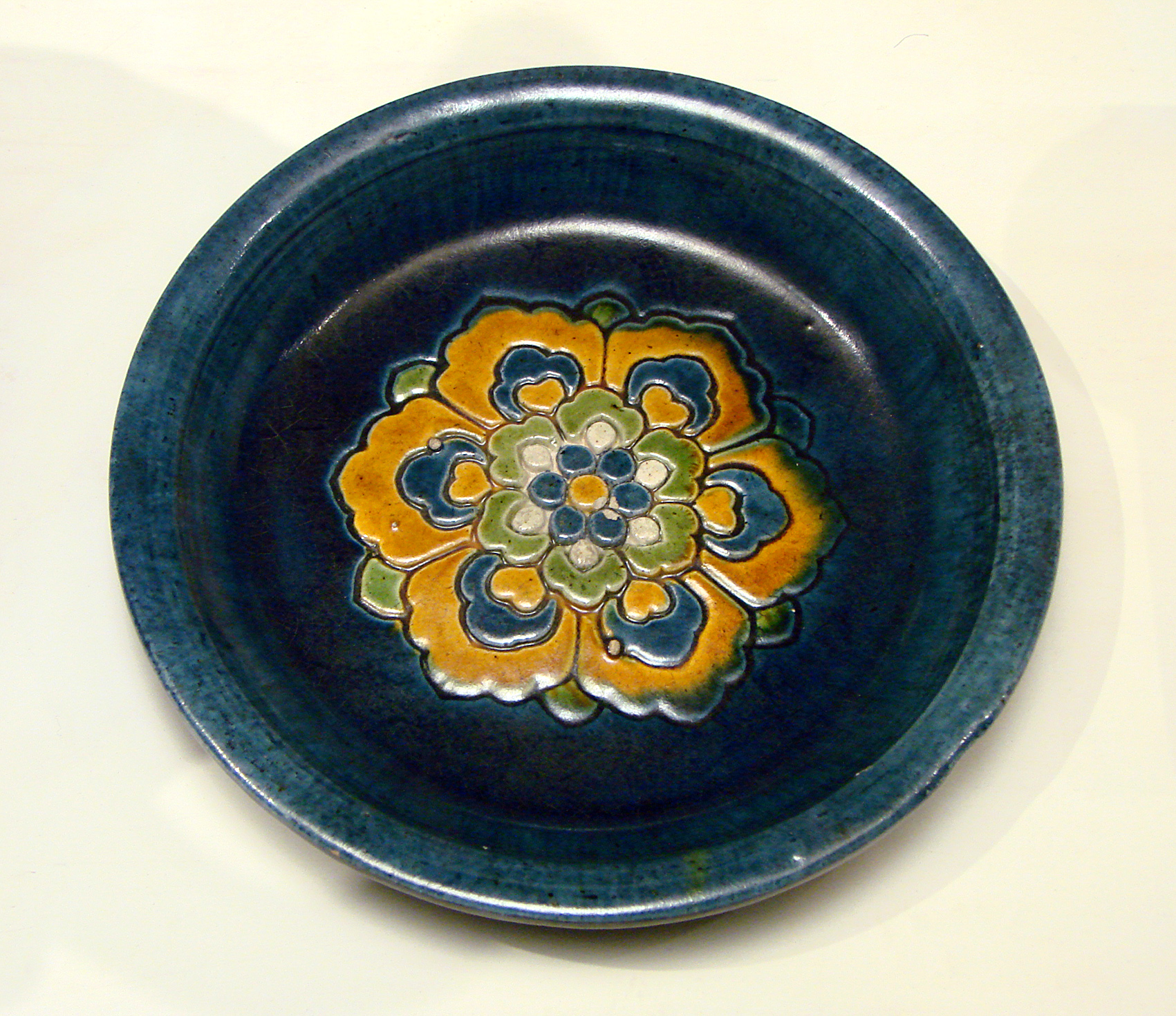
A sancai porcelain dish from the Tang dynasty, 8th century

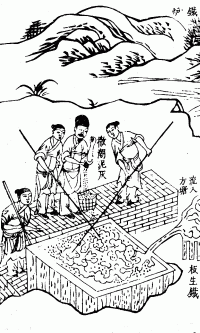
The puddling process of smelting iron ore to make wrought iron from pig iron, the right half of the illustration (not shown) displays men working a blast furnace, Tiangong Kaiwu encyclopedia published in 1637, written by Song Yingxing (1587–1666).

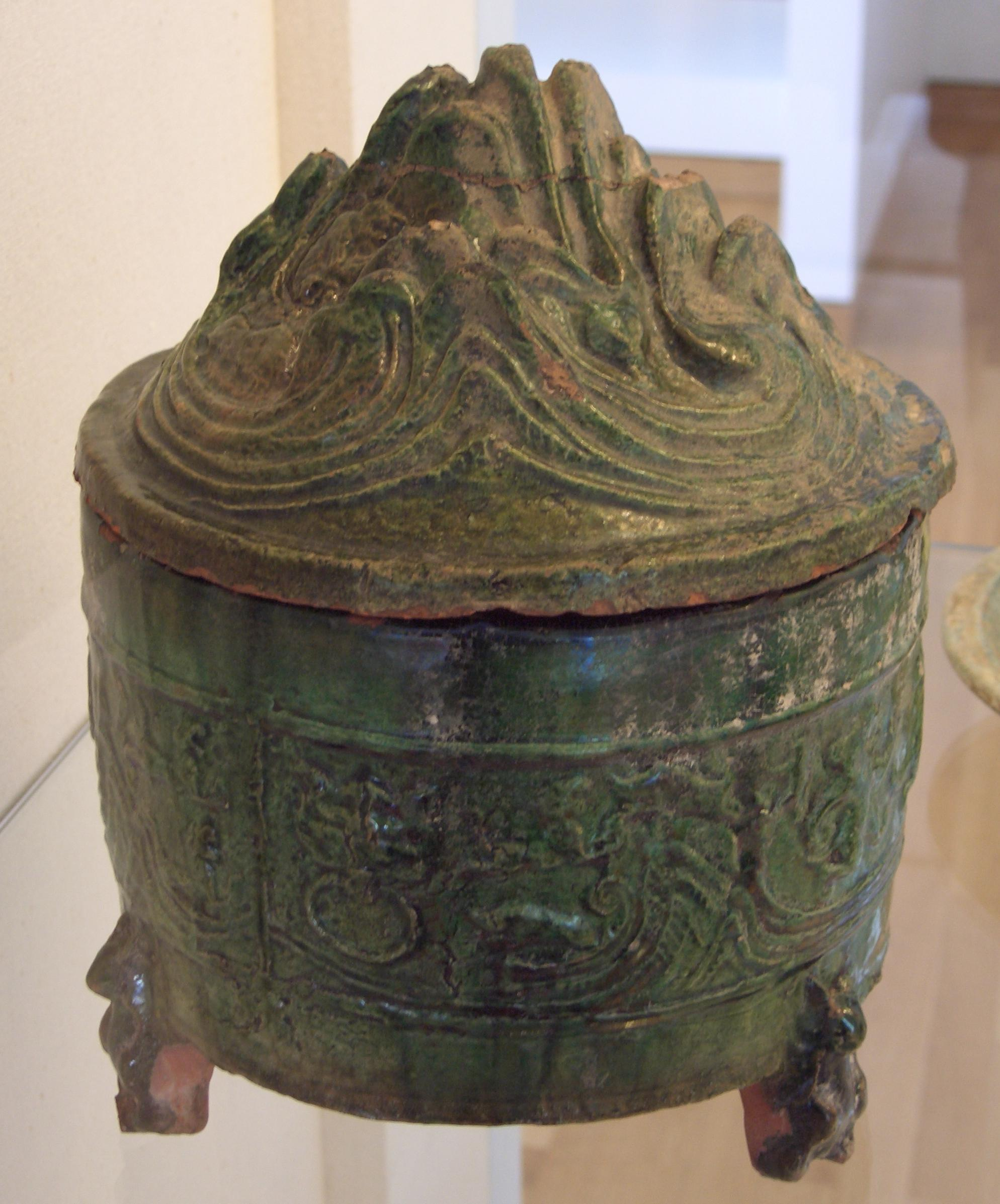
The British scientist, historian, and sinologist Joseph Needham writes that the development of the raised-relief map in China may have been influenced by Han dynasty (202 BC – 220 AD) incense burners and jars such as this, showing artificial mountains as a lid decoration; these were often used to depict the mythical Penglai Island.

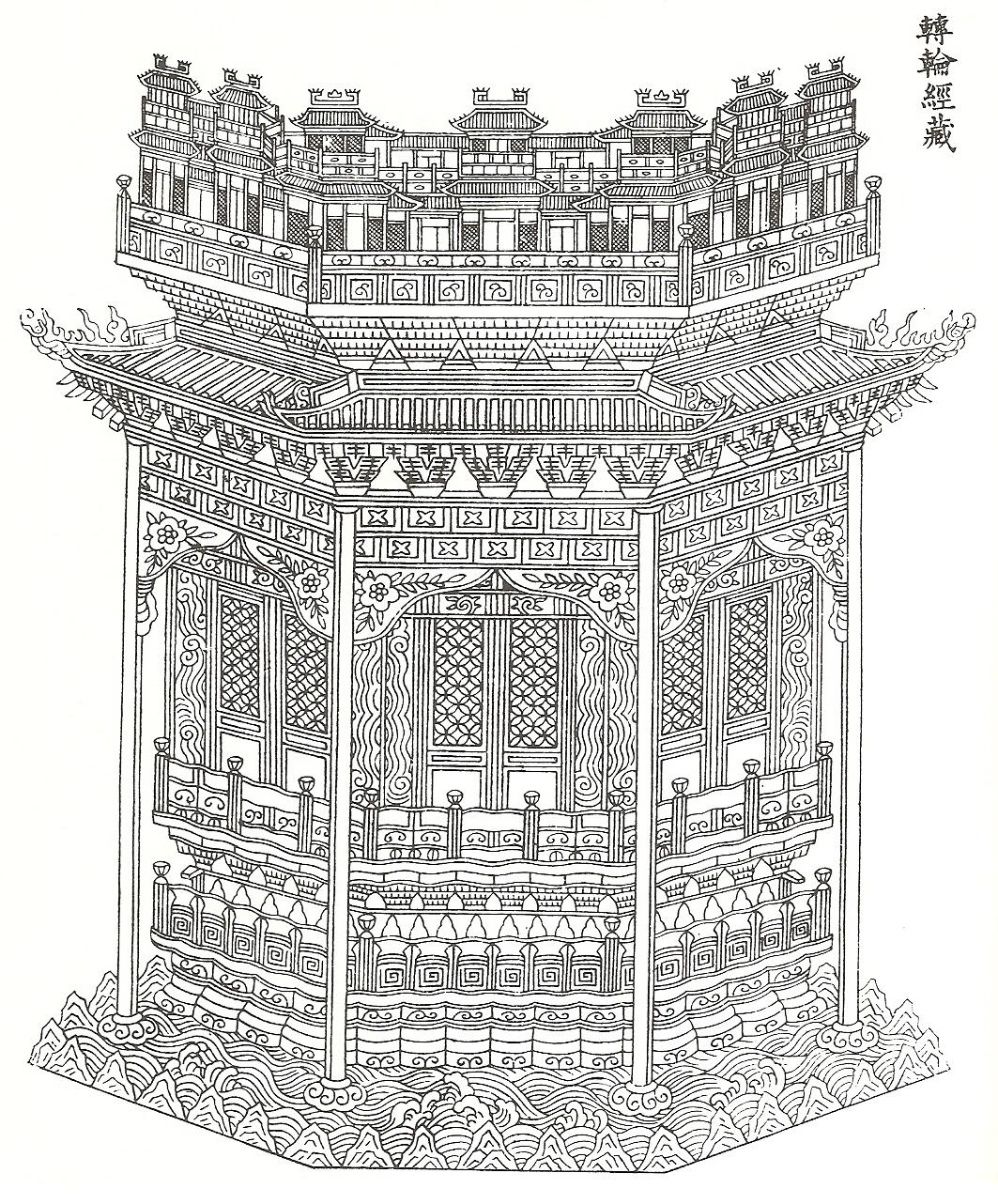
A 12th-century illustration of a revolving bookcase for Buddhist scriptures as depicted in Li Jie's architectural treatise the Yingzao Fashi.

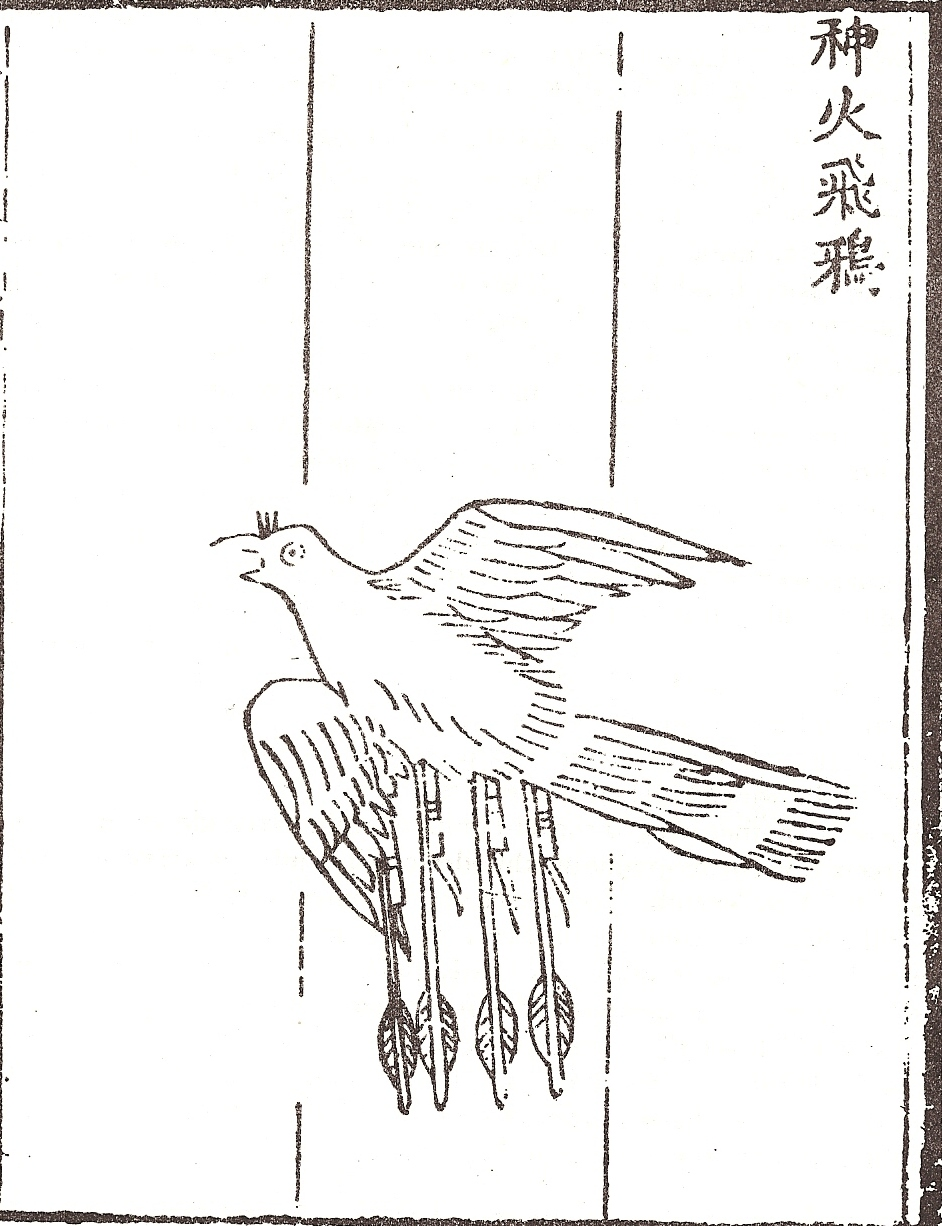
The 'flying crow with magic fire' winged rocket bomb from the Huolongjing, mid 14th century, compiled by Liu Bowen and Jiao Yu

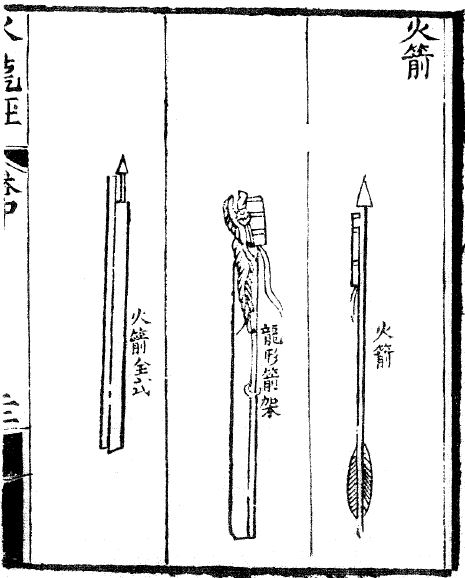
Depiction of rocket arrows, from the Huolongjing. The right arrow reads 'fire arrow' (huo jian), the middle is a 'dragon shaped arrow frame' (long xing jian jia), and the left is a 'complete fire arrow' (huo jian quan shi).

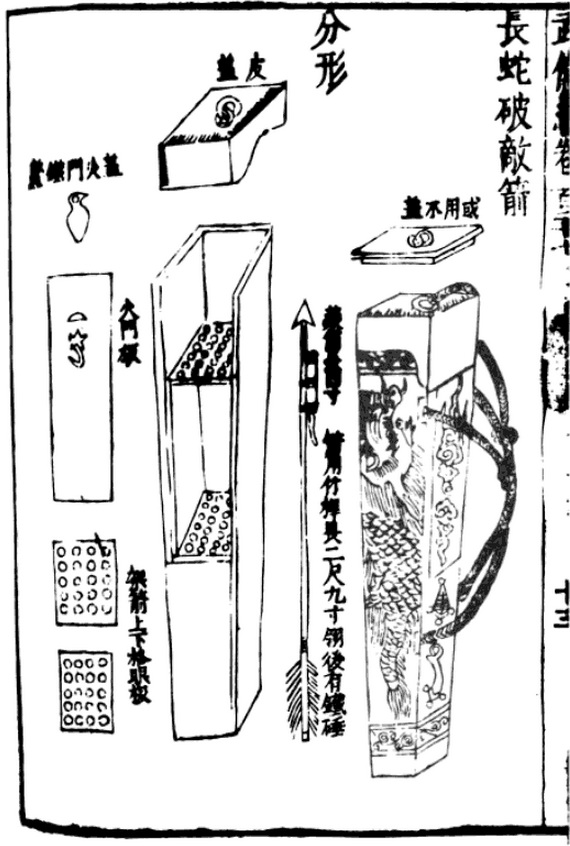
A depiction of the 13th Century "long serpent" rocket launcher. The holes in the frame are designed to keep the rockets separate, from the 1510 edition of Wujing Zongyao.

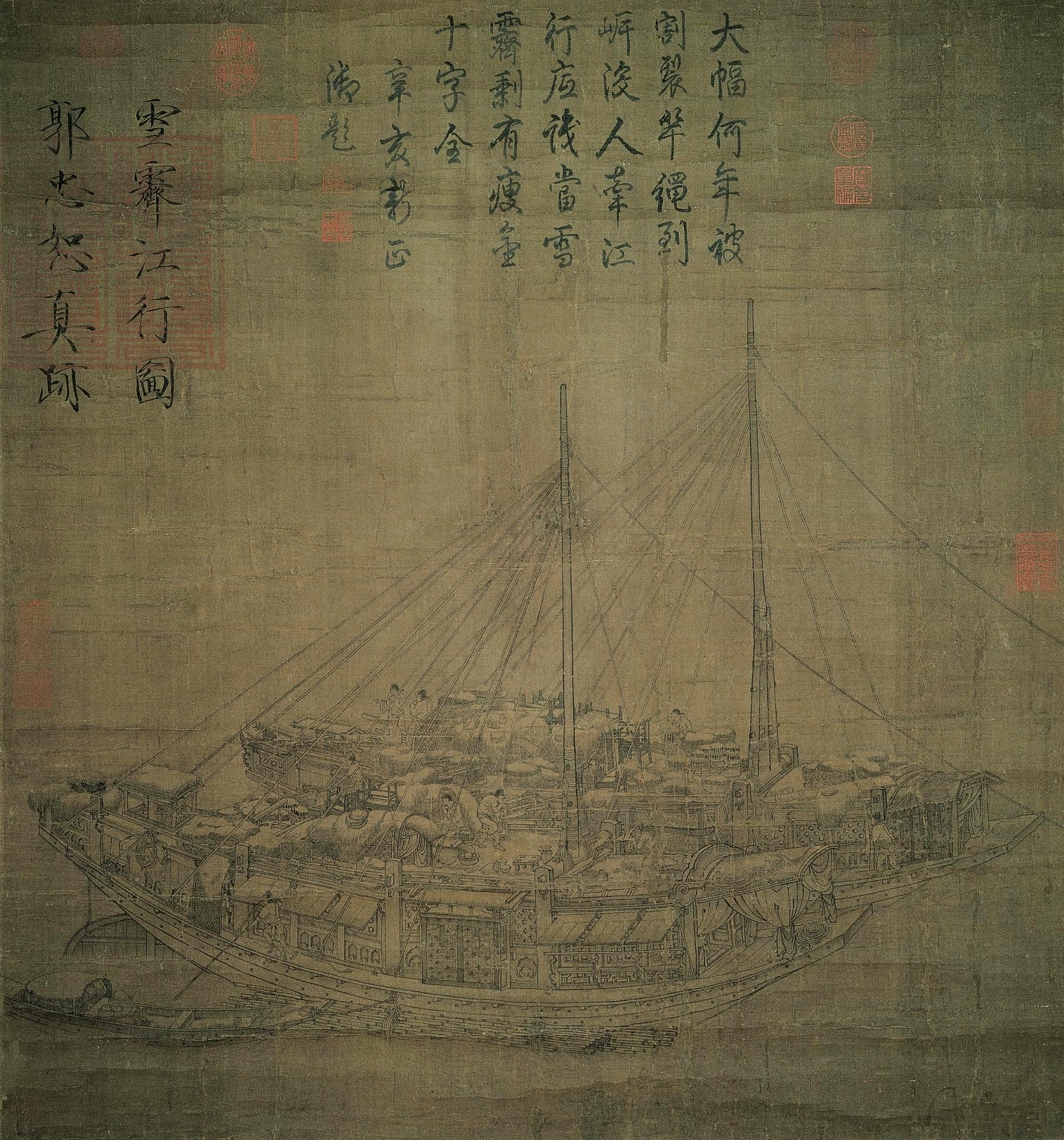
A Song dynasty painting on silk of two Chinese cargo ships accompanied by a smaller boat; notice the large stern-mounted rudder on the ship shown in the foreground

- Land mine: Textual evidence suggests that the first use of a land mine in history was by a Song dynasty brigadier general known as Lou Qianxia, who used an 'enormous bomb' (huo pao) to kill Mongol soldiers invading Guangxi in 1277. However, the first detailed description of the land mine was given in the Huolongjing text written by Ming dynasty writer, military strategist and philosopher Jiao Yu (fl. 14th to early 15th century) and Liu Bowen (1311–1375) during the late Yuan dynasty (1271–1368) and early Ming dynasty (1368–1644). Jiao and Liu wrote that land mines were spherical, made of cast iron, and their fuses ignited by a mechanism tripped by enemy movement; although Jiao and Liu did not describe this trip mechanism in full detail, a later text of 1606 revealed that enemy movement released a pin that allowed hidden underground weights to fall and spin a chord around an axle that rotated a spinning wheel acting as a flint to spark a train of fuses.
- Land sailing: The use of the land sail in China dates from at least as early as the Northern and Southern dynasties period. The earliest text describing the Chinese use of mounting masts and sails on large vehicles is the Book of the Golden Hall Master written by the Daoist scholar and crown prince Xiao Yi, who later became Emperor Yuan of Liang (r. 552–554 AD).
- Leeboard: To avoid leeward drift caused by the force of wind in sailing, the leeboard was invented; it was a board lowered onto the side of the ship opposite to the direction of the wind, helping the ship to stay upright and afloat even if the hull was breached. British writers Paul Johnstone and Sean McGrail state that an odd-looking second paddle on a bronze drum of the Dong Son culture (centered in the Red River Delta of northern Vietnam) may depict a leeboard in use as early as 300 BC. Leeboards may have been invented in China as early as the 8th century during the Tang dynasty and are featured shortly after in 9th century engraved artwork found at the Borobudur monument built during the Sailendra dynasty of Central Java (Indonesia). Leeboards were first used in the West by the Dutch, during the 15th to 16th centuries (possibly used on early Dutch cogs, or perhaps influenced by a Chinese origin).
- Louche: The louche (耬車) was a mobile animal-drawn agricultural seed drill invented by the Chinese agronomist Zhao Guo, a Han official in charge of agricultural production during the reign of Han Wudi in the Han dynasty. According to the records of Political Commentator by the Eastern Han dynasty writer Cui Shi, the Louche consisted of three feet and thus was called three-legged Lou. The three legs had three ditch diggers under it used for sowing. The Louche was animal powered and was pulled by an ox and the leg of the Louche directly dug a ditch in the flattened soil, sowed the seeds, covered the seeds, and pressed the land flat at the same time. The machine was known for its utility and efficiency for serving several agricultural uses at the same time, and saving time and effort.

=== M ===
- Magic mirrors: In about 800 AD, during the Tang dynasty (618–907), a book entitled Record of Ancient Mirrors described the method of crafting solid bronze mirrors with decorations, written characters, or patterns on the reverse side that could cast these in a reflection on a nearby surface as light struck the front, polished side of the mirror; because of this seemingly transparent effect, they were called 'light-penetration mirrors' by the Chinese. Unfortunately, this Tang era book was lost over the centuries, but magic mirrors were described in the Dream Pool Essays by the Song dynasty polymath Shen Kuo (1031–1095), who owned three of them as a family heirloom. Perplexed as to how solid metal could be transparent, Shen guessed that some sort of quenching technique was used to produce tiny wrinkles on the face of the mirror too small to be observed by the eye. Although his explanation of different cooling rates was incorrect, he was right to suggest the surface contained minute variations which the naked eye could not detect; these mirrors also had no transparent quality at all, as discovered by British scientist and mathematician William Bragg in 1932.
- Mahjong: The Dutch journalist and writer Jelte Rep writes that the gambling game of mahjong (Traditional Chinese: 麻將; pinyin: májiàng), which employs a set of over a hundred tiles, was first invented in 1846 by Zhen Yumen, a Ningpo city diplomatic official. However, Rep traces the origins of the game to a card game of the Tang dynasty (618–907) which used thirty-two wood or ivory pieces in the shape of cards. This evolved into the forty-card game of madiao (馬吊) during the Ming dynasty (1368–1644), which had four suits of cards instead of the three found in modern mahjong.
- Match: The earliest type of match for lighting fire was made in China by 577 AD, invented by Northern Qi (550–577) court ladies as they desperately looked for materials to light fires for cooking and heating as enemy troops of Northern Zhou (557–581) and the Chen dynasty (557–589) besieged their city from outside. Early matches in China were designed to be lit by an existing flame and carried to light another fire. They were pinewood sticks impregnated with sulfur and needed only a slight touch from a flame to light. This was written in the Records of the Unworldly and Strange by Tao Gu in 950 (Five Dynasties and Ten Kingdoms period).
- Mechanical theater (driven by carriage wheels): The inventors of the field mill mentioned above, Xie Fei and Wei Mengbian of the Later Zhao (319–351 AD), also invented an intricate mechanical theater mounted on a carriage, its figures operated by motive power (i.e. simply advancing the carriage forward). From 335 to 345 AD, they worked at the court of the ethnic-Jie emperor Shi Hu (334–349). The vehicle they crafted was a four-wheeled and 6 m (20 ft) long carriage that was about 3 m (9.8 ft) wide. On it rested a large golden Buddha statue with a Daoist statue continually rubbing his front with his mechanical hand. The Buddha was also surrounded by ten wooden Daoists who rotated around him in a circuit, periodically bowing to him, saluting him, and throwing incense into a censer. Above the Buddha were nine dragon-headed faucets which spouted water. Like the field mill and the pounding cart of these two inventors, when the carriage halted, so did all of its moving components of mechanical statues and spouting faucets.
- Mechanical cup-bearers and wine-pourers on automatic-traveling boats: The mechanical engineer Huang Gun served the court of Emperor Yang Di (r. 604–617) and wrote the book Shuishi Tujing on his inventions, which his colleague Du Bao enlarged and commented on. He constructed seven small boats, called 'wine boats', that were as large as 3 m (9.8 ft) long and 1.8 m (5.9 ft) wide which supported a number of mechanical figures of wooden statues called 'hydraulic elegances', each about 0.6 m (2.0 ft) tall, some of them animals but most in human form consisting of singing girls, musicians playing actual instruments, dancers and tumblers, oarsmen busy rowing, cup-bearers, and wine-pourers all moving simultaneously as if alive. These boats were set to travel at timed intervals along circuits made of winding stone channels and canals in palace courtyards and gardens (designed by Tang Haogui), where guests would gather for special occasions. The cup-bearer stood at the bow of each ship and beside him the wine-pourer; when the ship made automatically timed periodic stops where guests were seated, the cup-bearer automatically stretched out his arm with a full cup of wine. When the guest was done emptying his cup, he placed the cup back into the figure's hands; the latter then waited as the wine-pourer filled a second cup to be emptied. When this guest had been served, the wine boat automatically moved onwards to the next stop. The British sinologist, scientist, and historian Joseph Needham speculates that the "wine boats" may have been driven by paddle-wheels. Another paddle-wheel ship was commanded by Wang Zhen'e and was described in his biographies, dated from the Liu Song dynasty (420–479). side from the partial remains of the Shuishi Tujing, an account of these 'wine boats' was also preserved by Huang Gun's contemporary Yan Shigu (581–645).
- Modular system of architecture, eight standard grades: Although other texts preceded it, such as the 'National Building Law' of the Tang dynasty (618–907) which was partially preserved in other texts, the Yingzao Fashi published in 1103 by the Song dynasty (960–1279) scholar-official Li Jie (1065–1110) is the oldest known Chinese architectural treatise that has survived fully intact. It contains descriptions and illustrations detailing the cai fen system (材份制) of eight standard dimensions for module components of timber architecture and structural carpentry. The eight standard grades of module timber components in the Yingzao Fashi, with grade I being the largest and grade VIII the smallest, were used to determine the ultimate proportions and scale of a building as a whole, as all timber hall types—palaces, mansions, ordinary houses, and pavilions—were hierarchically categorized along the lines of which cai fen grade was employed. For example, palace-type buildings used only grades I through V, and mansion-type buildings never used components larger than grade III and no less than grade VI. In this system of structural carpentry, the smallest grade of VIII is represented by one cai; one cai is equal to the modern equivalent of 15 cm (5.9 in), and one cai is also divided into fifteen fen (hence the title of this modular system).
- Moldboard plow: Although use of the simple wooden ard in China must have preceded it, the earliest discovered Chinese iron plows date from about 500 BC, during the Zhou dynasty (1122–256 BC) and were flat, V-shaped, and mounted on wooden poles and handles. By the 3rd century BC, improved iron casting techniques led to the development of the heavy moldboard plow, seen in Han dynasty (202 BC – 220 AD) artwork such as tomb carved bricks. The moldboard allowed the Chinese to turn farm soil without clogging the plowshare with dirt, which was flung off the wheelbarrow via slanted wings on both sides. The frame of excavated plowshares from the Warring States period (403–221 BC) were made mostly of perishable wood, the frame of excavated plowshares from the Han dynasty were made entirely of solid iron, with the moldboard attached to the top to turn the soil.
- Multistage rocket: Although there is still some ambiguity as to whether the earliest rockets of the 13th century were first developed in Europe (i.e. 'ignis volantis in aere' in the work of Marcus Graecus about 1232, although Needham and Davis assert it was most likely a fire lance), the Middle East (i.e. 'sahm al-Khitāi' or 'arrows of China' as referred to by Hasan al-Rhammāh in 1280) or China (i.e. 'di lao shu' or 'ground rat' mentioned in 1264 or the 'chong' mortar used by the armies of the Song dynasty and invading Mongols during the 1270s), during the Yuan dynasty (1271–1368) the term 'fire arrow' once implied to mean incendiary arrows during the Tang dynasty was then used to describe the true rocket, producing a headache, as Needham says, for historians; the Huolongjing written by military officer Jiao Yu (fl. 14th to early 15th century) and the Song dynasty Chinese philosopher and politician Liu Bowen (1311–1375) during the early Ming dynasty (1368–1644) described several types of rockets, one of them being a multistage rocket known as the 'huo long chu shui' or 'fire dragon issuing from the water' which, despite its name, was not launched from beneath the water from a primitive submarine but rather at near water-level maintaining a flat trajectory; defined as a two-stage rocket, it employed booster rockets that, when about to burn out of use, ignited a swarm of smaller rocket arrows fired from the front end of the missile shaped as a dragon's mouth.
- Multiple-tube seed drill: The wooden seed drill existed in China by the 3rd century BC, and the multiple-tube iron seed drill was first invented in China by the 2nd century BC, during the Han dynasty (202 BC – 220 AD). The seed drill allowed for greater speed and regulation of distributing seeds in lined rows of crops instead of casting them out onto the farm field.

=== N ===
- Natural gas for fuel: On tomb brick reliefs of Sichuan province, dating from the Han dynasty (202 BC – AD 220), scenes of borehole drilling for mining projects are shown. They show towering derricks lifting liquid brine through bamboo pipes to the surface so that the brine could be distilled in evaporation pans over the heat of furnaces and produce salt. The furnaces were potentially heated by natural gas brought by airtight jointed bamboo pipes for miles to towns and villages, yet gas brought up from perhaps 610 m (2,000 ft) below the surface could cause an explosion if it was not properly mixed with oxygen first, so the Han dynasty Chinese possibly built underground carburetor chambers and siphoned some of the gas off with exhaust pipes.
- Nail polish: Originated in 3000 BCE. In 600 BCE, the royal house in the Zhou dynasty preferred the colors gold and silver. However, red and black eventually replaced these metallic colors as royal favorites. During the Ming dynasty, nail polish was often made from a mixture that included beeswax, egg whites, gelatin, vegetable dyes, and gum arabic.
- Naval mine: The Huolongjing military manuscript written by Ming dynasty military writer, strategist, and philosopher Jiao Yu (fl. 14th to early 15th century) and Chinese military strategist, philosopher, statesman and poet Liu Bowen (1311–1375) also describes naval mines used at sea or on rivers and lakes; made of wrought iron and enclosed in an ox bladder, it was a timed device in that a burning joss sticks floating above the mine determined when the fuse was to be ignited; the text explicitly mentions that without air and doused in water the fuse would not burn, so the fuse was protected by a long waterproof tube made out of goat's intestine; a later model shown in Ming Chinese scientist and encyclopedist Song Yingxing's (1587–1666) encyclopedia of 1637 shows the ox bladder replaced with a lacquered leather bag while the mine is ignited by a rip cord pulled from the shore to rotate a flint-and-steel firing mechanism.
- Nickel silver: Nickel silver was first known and used in China during the 17th or later centuries. It was "smuggled into various parts of the East Indies", despite a government ban on the export of nickel silver.

=== O ===
- Open-spandrel segmental arch bridge: The earliest known fully stone open-spandrel segmental arch bridge is the Zhaozhou Bridge in southern Hebei province, China, completed in 605 by the Sui dynasty (581–618) engineer Li Chun. The bridge span is 37.5 m (123 ft); the structure weighs relatively little, because of the four semi-circular arch spandrels, which allow flood waters to pass through. Other Chinese bridges would be influenced by this design, such as the open-spandrel Yongtong Bridge of Zhao County, Hebei built in 1130, and the simple segmental arch Lugou Bridge built in 1698 (originally in 1189). The latter, just west of Beijing, has eleven segmental arches.
- Oil refining: The Chinese were among the first civilizations to refine oil. During 512 A.D. and 518 A.D., in the late Northern Wei dynasty, the Chinese geographer, politician, and writer Li Daoyuan introduced the process of refining oil intro various lubricants in his famous work Commentary on the Water Classic. During the first century AD, the Chinese were among the first peoples to refine oil for use as an energy source. During the Northern Song dynasty, a workshop called the "Fierce Oil Workshop", was established in the city of Kaifeng to produce refined oil for the Song military as a weapon. The troops would then fill the iron cans with refined oil and threw them toward the enemy troops, causing a fire—effectively the world's first "fire bomb" The workshop was one of the world's earliest oil refining factories where thousands of people worked to produce Chinese oil powered weaponry.
- Oil well: The earliest record of an oil well dates from AD 347, in China. Petroleum was used in ancient China for "lighting, as a lubricant for cart axles and the bearings of water-powered drop hammers, as a source of carbon for inksticks, and as a medical remedy for sores on humans and mange in animals." The earliest depiction of an oil well dates from AD 1762.

=== P ===
- Paper cup: Paper cups have been documented in imperial China, alongside paper napkins. Paper cups were known as chih pei and were used for the serving of tea. They were constructed in different sizes and colors, and were adorned with decorative designs.
- Paper lantern: The paper lantern is a lighting device made of paper. Early lanterns in China were constructed with silk, paper, or animal skin with frames made of bamboo or wood. One of the earliest descriptions of paper lanterns is found in records from Khotan, which describe a "mounting lantern" made of white paper.
- Paper napkin: Paper napkins, or chih pha, accompanied tea cups and were folded into squares. Textual evidence of paper napkins appears in a description of the possessions of the Yu family, from the city of Hangzhou.
- Paper packaging: The first use of paper used in packaging was for treated mulberry barks in the early first of second century BC.
- Pendulum: Han dynasty scientist Zhang Heng created a pendulum in the 1st-century for a seismometer. Its function was to sway and activate one of a series of levers after being disturbed by the tremor of an earthquake.
- Percussion drilling: Ancient China's principal drilling technique, percussive drilling, was invented during the Han dynasty. The process involved two to six men jumping on a level at rhythmic intervals to raise a heavy iron bit attached to long bamboo cables from a bamboo derrick. Utilizing cast iron bits and tools constructed of bamboo, the early Chinese were able to use percussion drilling to drill holes to a depth of 3,000 ft. The construction of percussion drilling machines took more than two to three generations of workers. The cable tool drilling machines developed by the early Chinese involved raising and dropping a heavy string of drilling tools to crush through rocks into diminutive fragments. In addition, the Chinese also used a cutting head secured to bamboo rods to drill to depths of 915 m. The raising and dropping of the bamboo drill strings allowed the drilling machine to penetrate less dense and unconsolidated rock formations.
- Petroleum as fuel: The use of petroleum dates from ancient China more than 2,000 years ago. In I Ching, one of the earliest Chinese writings cites the use of oil in its raw state without refining was first discovered, extracted, and used in China in the first century BC. In addition, the Chinese were the first to use petroleum as fuel as the early as the fourth century BC.
- Pig iron: The earliest pig iron dates from the Zhou dynasty. By the 5th century, archaeological evidence indicates that pig iron was melted to produce cast iron. In Europe, the process was not invented until the late medieval ages.
- Pinhole camera: The ancient Chinese philosopher Mozi (c. 470 BC – c. 391 BC)—founder of Mohism during the establishment of the Hundred Schools of Thought—is the claimed author of the Mojing (perhaps compiled by his disciples) which described the pinhole camera. The Mojing stated that the collecting place (pinhole) was an empty hole "like the sun and moon depicted on the imperial flags," where an image could be inverted at an intersecting point which "affects the size of the image." The Mojing seems to be in line with the Epicurean theory of light traveling into the eye (and not vice versa like in Pythagoreanism), since the Mojing states that the reflected light shining forth from an "illuminated person" becomes inverted when passing through the pinhole, i.e. "The bottom part of the man becomes the top part (of the image) and the top part of the man becomes the bottom part (of the image)." In his Book of Optics (1021), Ibn al-Haytham (965–1039) wrote of his experimentation with camera obscura, which was followed by Song dynasty polymath Shen Kuo (1031–1095), the latter who alluded that the Tang dynasty (618–907) writer Duan Chengshi (died 863)—in his Miscellaneous Morsels from Youyang—described inverted images of Chinese pagodas.
- Playing cards: The first reference to the card game in world history dates from no later than the 9th century, when the Collection of Miscellanea at Duyang, written by Su E (fl. 880), described the Wei clan (family of Princess Tongchang's husband) of the Tang dynasty (AD 618–907) enjoying the "leaf game" in 868. The Yezi Gexi was a book on the card came which was allegedly written by a Tang woman and commented on by Chinese scholars in subsequent dynasties. In his Notes After Retirement, the Song dynasty (960–1279) scholar Ouyang Xiu (1007–1072) asserted that playing card games existed since the mid Tang dynasty and associated this invention with the simultaneous evolution of the common Chinese writing medium from paper rolls to sheets of paper that could be printed. During the Ming dynasty (1368–1644), characters from popular novels such as the Water Margin were widely featured on the faces of playing cards. By the 11th century playing cards could be found throughout the Asian continent. Playing cards were some of the first printed materials in Europe, appearing by the 14th century (i.e. in Spain and Germany in 1377, in Italy and Belgium in 1379, and in France in 1381) and produced by European woodblock printing before the innovation of the early modern printing press by German inventor, printer, publisher and blacksmith Johannes Gutenberg (c. 1400–1468).
- Pontoon bridge: The Zhou dynasty Chinese text of the Shi Jing (Book of Odes) records that King Wen of Zhou was the first to create a pontoon bridge in the 11th century BC. However, Needham has pointed out that in all likely scenarios, the temporary pontoon bridge was invented during the 9th or 8th century BC in China, as this part was perhaps a later addition to the book (considering how the book had been edited up until the Han dynasty, 202 BC–220 AD). Although earlier temporary pontoon bridges had been made in China, the first secure and permanent ones (and linked with iron chains) in China came first during the Qin dynasty (221 BC–207 BC). The later Song dynasty (960–1279 AD) Chinese statesman Cao Cheng once wrote a description of the early pontoon bridges in China. During the Eastern Han dynasty (25–220 AD), the Chinese created a very large pontoon bridge that spanned across the width of the Yellow River. There was also the rebellion of Gongsun Shu in 33 AD, where a large pontoon bridge with fortified posts was constructed across the Yangtze River, eventually broken through with ramming ships by official Han troops under Commander Cen Peng. During the late Eastern Han into the Three Kingdoms period, during the Battle of Chibi in 208 AD, the Prime Minister Cao Cao once linked the majority of his fleet together with iron chains, which proved to be a fatal mistake once he was thwarted with a fire attack by Sun Quan's fleet. The armies of Emperor Taizu of Song had a large pontoon bridge built across the Yangtze River in 974 in order to secure supply lines during the Song dynasty's conquest of the Southern Tang.
- Porcelain: Although glazed ceramics existed beforehand, the author and historian Samuel Adrian M. Adshead writes that the earliest type of vitrified, translucent ceramics that could be classified as true porcelain was not made until the Tang dynasty (618–907). Archaeologist Nigel Wood states that true porcelain was manufactured in northern China from roughly the beginning of the Tang dynasty in the 7th century, and true porcelain was not manufactured in southern China until about 300 years later, during the early 10th century.
- Pound lock: Indirect evidence suggests that pound locks may have been used in antiquity by the Ptolemaic Greeks and the Romans. In China, although the one gate canal flash lock existed beforehand, the two-gate pound lock was invented in 984 by an official of Huainan and engineer named Qiao Weiyo, during the early Song dynasty (960–1279), so that ships could safely travel along canal waterways having gated and segmented chambers where water levels could be regulated. The economic and transport benefits of this innovation were described by the polymath official and inventor Shen Kuo (1031–1095) in his Dream Pool Essays.
- Puppet theater, waterwheel-powered: The mechanical toys of Roman Egypt, especially the weight-driven puppet theater of Heron of Alexandria (c. 10–70 AD), are well known and discussed by historians such as Beck, Prou, and de Rochas d'Aiglun. In China, Zhang Heng (78–139) wrote of plays with artificial fish and dragons, and a 6th-century text Xijing Zaji states that when Liu Bang (reigned as Emperor Gaozu of Han from 202 to 195 BC) came upon the treasury of the deceased Qin Shihuang (r. 221–210) in 206 BC, he found an entire mechanical orchestra of 1 m (3.3 ft) tall puppets dressed in silk and playing mouth organs, all powered by pulling ropes and blowing into tubes. As written in the Records of the Three Kingdoms, the engineer Ma Jun (fl. 220–265)—already associated with the differential gear system of the south-pointing chariot—invented a mechanical theater powered by a rotating wooden waterwheel for the entertainment of Emperor Ming's (r. 226–239 AD) court. With the waterwheel in motion, a number of mechanical puppets performed tricks, such as singing girls who played music and danced, other puppets who would beat drums and sound flutes when one puppet entered the scene, puppets dancing on balls, throwing swords, hanging upside down on rope ladders, etc. Other mechanical puppets dressed as government officials did tasks in their offices, puppets dressed as laborers did jobs of pounding and grinding (trip hammer and millstone), while others watched cockfighting, all moving simultaneously. Water-powered puppet theaters in the tradition of Ma Jun were created in later dynasties as well.

=== R ===
- Raised-relief map (terrain model): The raised-relief map may have existed in China since the 3rd century BC, if the accounts in the Records of the Grand Historian (by Sima Qian, 91 BC) about Qin Shi Huang's (r. 221–210 BC) tomb prove correct (if it is excavated). It is known that Ma Yuan (14 BC – 49 AD) created a raised-relief map in 32 AD made out of rice, a type of map described in detail during the Tang dynasty (618–907) by Jiang Fang in his Essay on the Art of Constructing Mountains with Rice (c. 845). Xie Zhuang (421–466) of the Liu Song dynasty (420–479) created a 0.93 m^{2} (10.0 ft^{2}) wooden raised-relief map of the empire (showing mountains and rivers) which could be taken apart and pieced together like a giant jigsaw puzzle. The Song dynasty polymath Shen Kuo also created his own raised-relief map using sawdust, wood, beeswax, and wheat paste.
- Restaurant menu: During the early Song dynasty (960–1279), expanding trade and commerce brought money and people to the Song Chinese capital. The first restaurants sprang up and food like dumplings and noodles became available to the masses for a small price. Urban shopkeepers of the merchant middle class often had little time to eat at home, so they ventured out to eat at a variety of establishments such as temples, taverns, tea houses, food stalls, and restaurants which provided business for nearby brothels, singing-girl houses, and drama theaters; this along with traveling foreigners and Chinese who migrated to urban centers from regions with different cooking styles encouraged a demand for a variety of flavors served at urban restaurants, giving rise to the menu.
- Revolving bookcase: Revolving bookcases, known as zhuanluntang, have been documented in ancient China, and its invention is credited to Fu Xi in 544. Descriptions of revolving bookcases have been found in 8th- and 9th-century Chinese texts. Revolving bookcases were popularized in Buddhist monasteries during the Song dynasty under the reign of Emperor Taizu, who ordered the mass printing of the Buddhist Tripiṭaka scriptures. An illustration of a revolving bookcase is depicted in Li Jie's architectural treatise the Yingzao Fashi.
- Rock paper scissors: is an intransitive hand game, usually played between two people, in which each player simultaneously forms one of three shapes with an outstretched hand. These shapes are rock (a closed fist), paper (a flat hand), and scissors (a fist with the index finger and middle finger extended, forming a V shape).
- Rockets: The first gunpowder-powered rockets were developed during the Song dynasty and by the 13th century. The Chinese rocket technology was adopted by the Mongols and the invention was spread via the Mongol invasions to the Middle East and Europe in the mid-13th century. Rockets were used by the Song navy in a military exercise in 1245. Combustion rocket propulsion is mentioned in a reference to 1264, recording that the ground-rat, a type of firework, had frightened the Empress-Mother Gongsheng at a feast held in her honor by her son the Emperor Lizong. Subsequently, rockets are included in the military treatise Huolongjing, also known as the Fire Drake Manual, written by the Chinese artillery officer Jiao Yu in the mid-14th century. This text mentions the first known multistage rocket, the 'fire-dragon issuing from the water' (huo long chu shui), thought to have been used by the Chinese navy.
- Rocket bombs, aerodynamic wings and explosive payloads: The first known rockets fitted with aerodynamic wings are described as the 'flying crows with magic fire' in the oldest strata of the Huolongjing (early-to-mid 14th century), compiled by Jiao Yu and Liu Bowen during the early Ming dynasty (1368–1644). The body of the rocket was shaped like a bird (specifically a crow), packed with gunpowder, and made of bamboo laths forming a long basketwork frame that was reinforced with glued paper. A decorative head and tail were attached to the front and back ends, and the wings were nailed to the sides. Under each wing were two slanting rockets to propel the weapon; a main fuse was lit that ignited a fourfold fuse connected to each rocket and running through a drilled hole in the back of the bird. The book then claims that the rocket, after being launched high into the air and aimed at encampments or enemy boats, automatically produced an explosion upon impact that could be seen from considerably long distances.
- Rocket boosters: An illustration and description in the 14th century Chinese military treatise Huolongjing by the Ming dynasty military writer and philosopher Jiao Yu shows the oldest known multistage rocket with rocket boosters. The Huolongjing describes and illustrates the oldest known multistage rocket. It was a two-stage rocket that had carrier or booster rockets that would automatically ignite a number of smaller rocket arrows that were shot out of the front end of the missile, which was shaped like a dragon's head with an open mouth, before eventually burning out. This multi-stage rocket may be considered the ancestor to the modern YingJi-62 ASCM. The British scientist, sinologist, and historian Joseph Needham points out that the written material and depicted illustration of this rocket come from the oldest stratum of the Huolongjing, which can be dated roughly to AD 1300–1350. Solid rocket boosters finds its roots in the Chinese invented fire arrows invented during the medieval Song dynasty more than 1000 years ago, using gunpowder as solid rocket propellants. Gunpowder was packed into a bamboo case cylinder and an opening was created on the cylinders other end. As the gunpowder was ignited, it began to burn rapidly and created large amounts of gas that would rush out to create thrust.
- Rocket launcher: The earliest rocket launchers documented in imperial China launched fire arrows with launchers constructed of wood, basketry, and bamboo tubes. The rocket launchers divided the fire arrows with frames meant to keep the arrows separated, and were capable of firing multiple arrow rockets at once. Textual evidence and illustrations of various early rocket launchers are found in the 11th-century Northern Song dynasty text Wujing Zongyao. The Wujing Zongyao describes the "long serpent" rocket launcher, a rocket launcher constructed of wood and carried with a wheelbarrow, and the "hundred tiger" rocket launcher, a rocket launcher made of wood and capable of firing 320 rocket arrows. The text also describes a portable rocket arrow carrier consisting of a sling and a bamboo tube.
- Rotary fan, manual and water-powered: For purposes of air conditioning, the Han dynasty craftsman and mechanical engineer Ding Huan (fl. 180 AD) invented a manually operated rotary fan with seven wheels that measured 3 m (9.8 ft) in diameter; in the 8th century, during the Tang dynasty (618–907), the Chinese applied hydraulic power to rotate the fan wheels for air conditioning; the rotary fan became even more common during the Song dynasty (960–1279). The first rotary fan used in Europe was for mine ventilation during the 16th century, as illustrated by German mineralogist and metallurgist Georg Agricola (1494–1555).
- Rudder, stern-mounted and vertical axial: Lawrence V. Mott, who defines a steering oar as a rudder, states the ancient Egyptian use of stern-mounted rudders can be traced back to the 6th dynasty (2350–2200 BC). Mott states that the method of attachment for rudders in the Arab, Chinese, and European worlds differed from each other, leading him to doubt the spread of the Chinese system of attachment by socket-and-jaws or block and tackle (versus European pintle-and-gudgeon invented by c. 1180 AD). In regard to Mott's definition of a steering oar as a rudder, Joseph Needham, Richard Lefebvre des Noëttes, K. S. Tom, Chung Chee Kit, S. A. M. Adshead, Paul Johnstone, and Sean McGrail state that a steering oar is not a rudder; the steering oar can interfere with handling of the sails (limiting the potential for long ocean voyages) and it was fit more for small vessels on narrow, rapid-water transport; the rudder did not disturb the handling of the sails, took less of the helmsman's energy to operate, was better fit for larger vessels on ocean travel, and first appeared in China. Leo Block writes of the use of the steering oar in the ancient Mediterranean world (specifically in regards to the Phoenicians, 1550–300 BC): "A single sail tends to turn a vessel in an upwind or downwind direction, and rudder action is required to steer a straight course. A steering oar was used at this time because the rudder had not yet been invented. With a single sail, a frequent movement of the steering oar was required to steer a straight course; this slowed down the vessel because a steering oar (or rudder) course correction acts like a break." The oldest depicted rudders at the back of a ship, without the use of oars or a steering oar, comes from several ceramic models of Chinese ships made during both the Western and Eastern eras of the Han dynasty (202 BC – 220 AD). According to the scholars Zhang Zunyan and Vassilios Christides, there is literary evidence to suggest that the axial stern rudder existed in China since the 1st century BC; Gang Deng asserts the first reference was made in the Huainanzi of the 2nd century BC, and K. S. Tom says that the first clear reference is from the 5th century AD. However, K. S. Tom points to the fact that all Chinese pottery models of ships before this Guangzhou tomb model show steering oars instead of a rudder, which he states is strong evidence for the rudder's invention only by the 1st century AD. Jacques Gernet states that, although the Chinese had invented the rudder in the 1st century AD, it was not completely fixed to the sternpost of Chinese ships until the end of the 4th century. The bulkhead ship design of the junk, which appeared roughly the same time as the rudder, provided the essential vertical components for the hinged axial rudder. Deng points out that an Eastern Han (25–220) model distinctly shows a rudder in its own, separate cabin, suggesting that helmsmanship had already become an established profession. Tom and Deng state that, after the invention of the balanced rudder pivoted on an axis, the Chinese then innovated the fenestrated rudder by the Song dynasty (960–1279), with deliberate puncturing and boring out of holes in shapes such as diamonds, which, according to Tom, made the rudder "easier to steer, reduced turbulence drag, did not affect efficiency and was hydrodynamically sound."

=== S ===
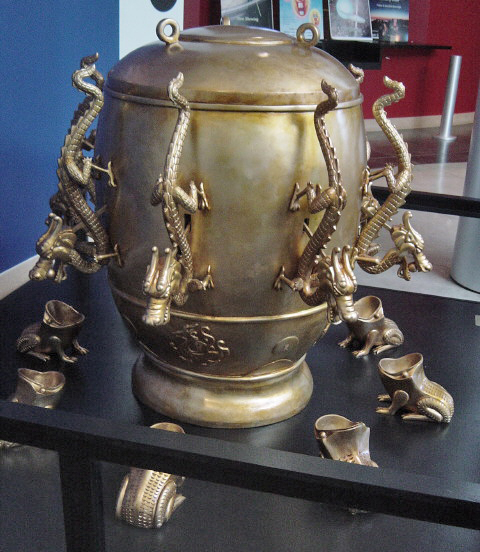
A replica of Zhang Heng's (78–139 AD) seismometer that employed a pendulum sensitive to inertia of ground tremors; while placed in Luoyang in 133, it detected an earthquake 400 to 500 km (250 to 310 mi) away in Gansu

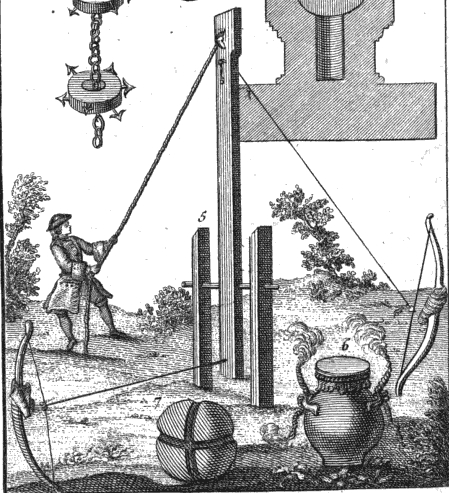
A depiction demonstrating the use of the Chinese stinkpot shown in the Traité sur les feux d'artifice pour le spectacle et pour la guerre by French pyrotechnician Jean-Charles Perrinet d'Orval, 1745

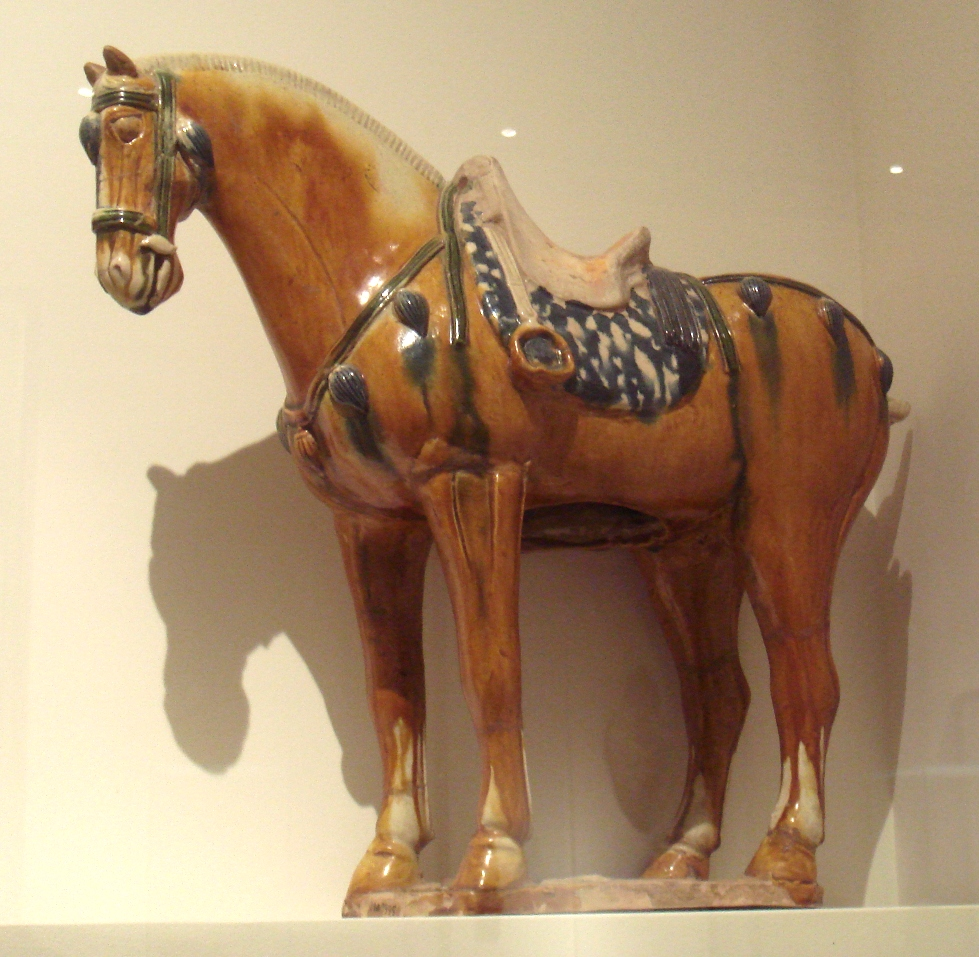
A sancai-glazed horse statue from the Tang dynasty (618–907) showing a rider's stirrup connected to the saddle

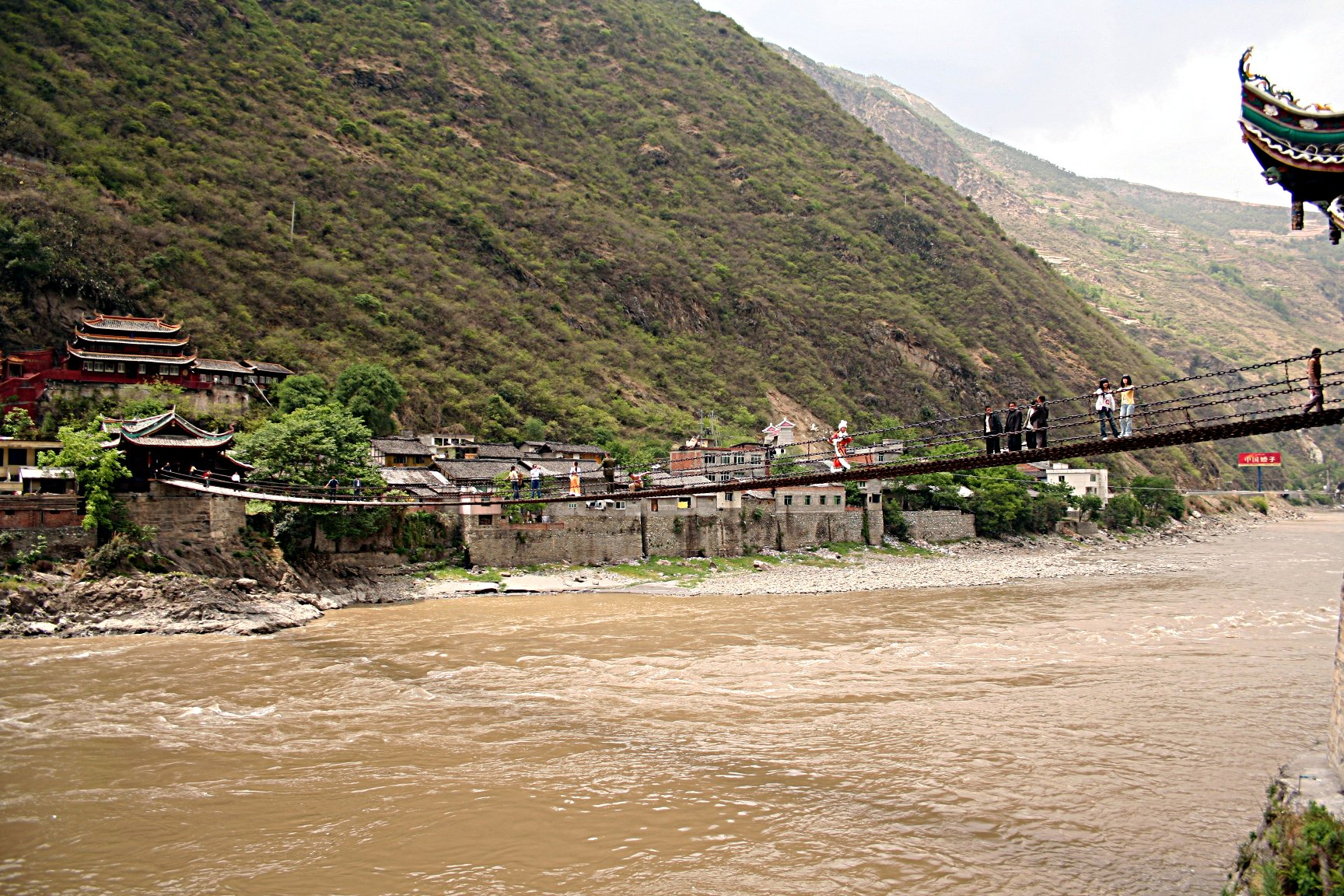
The Luding Bridge in Sichuan, an iron-chain suspension bridge

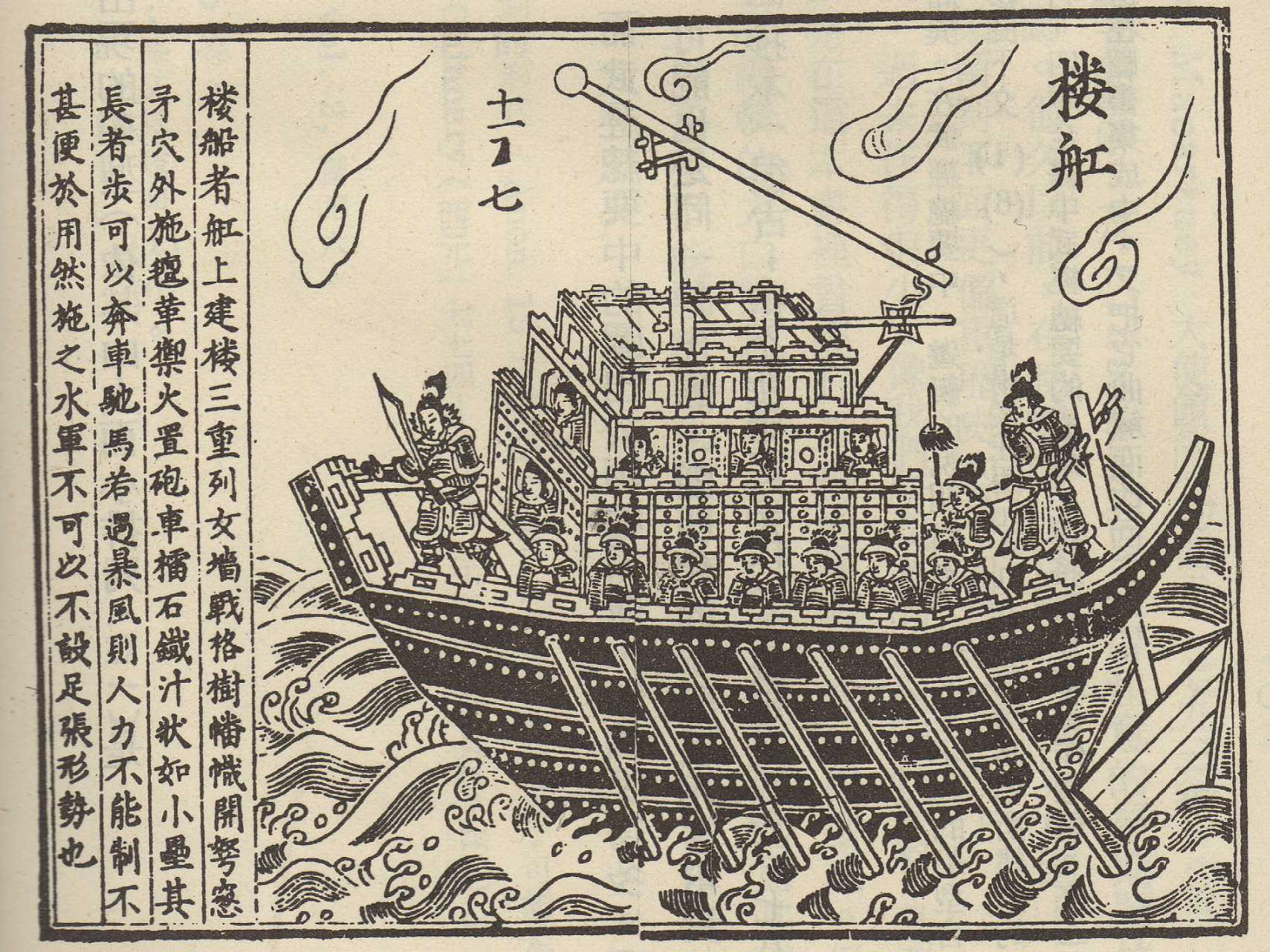
A Chinese Song dynasty naval tower ship with a Xuanfeng traction trebuchet catapult, taken from the Wujing Zongyao, 1044 AD

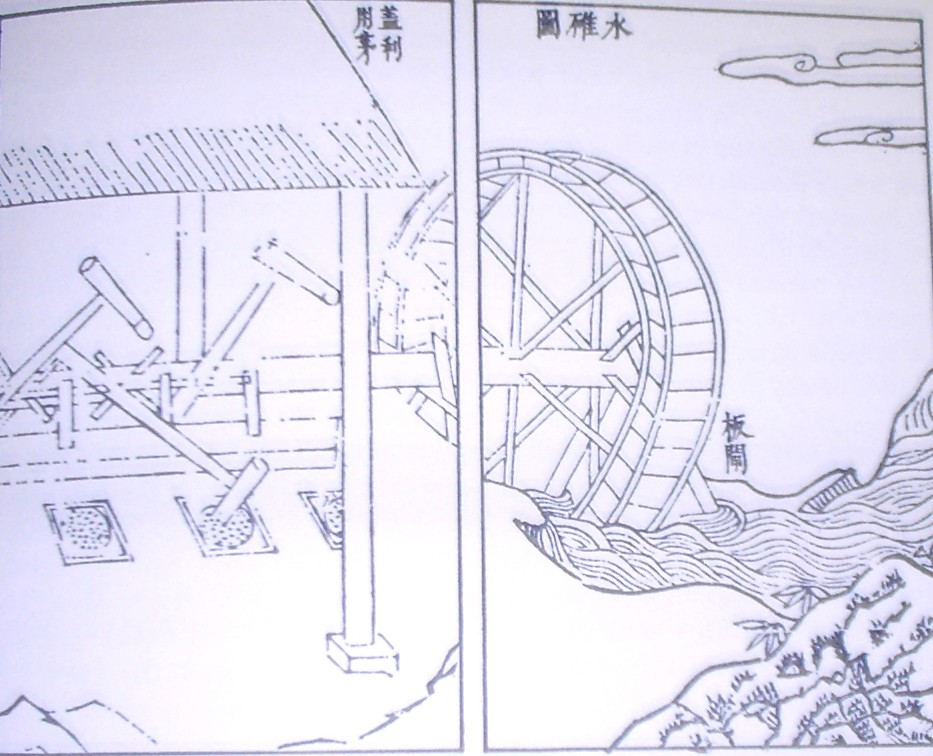
Hydraulic-powered trip hammers, from a Ming dynasty encyclopedia published in 1637 by Song Yingxing (1587–1666)

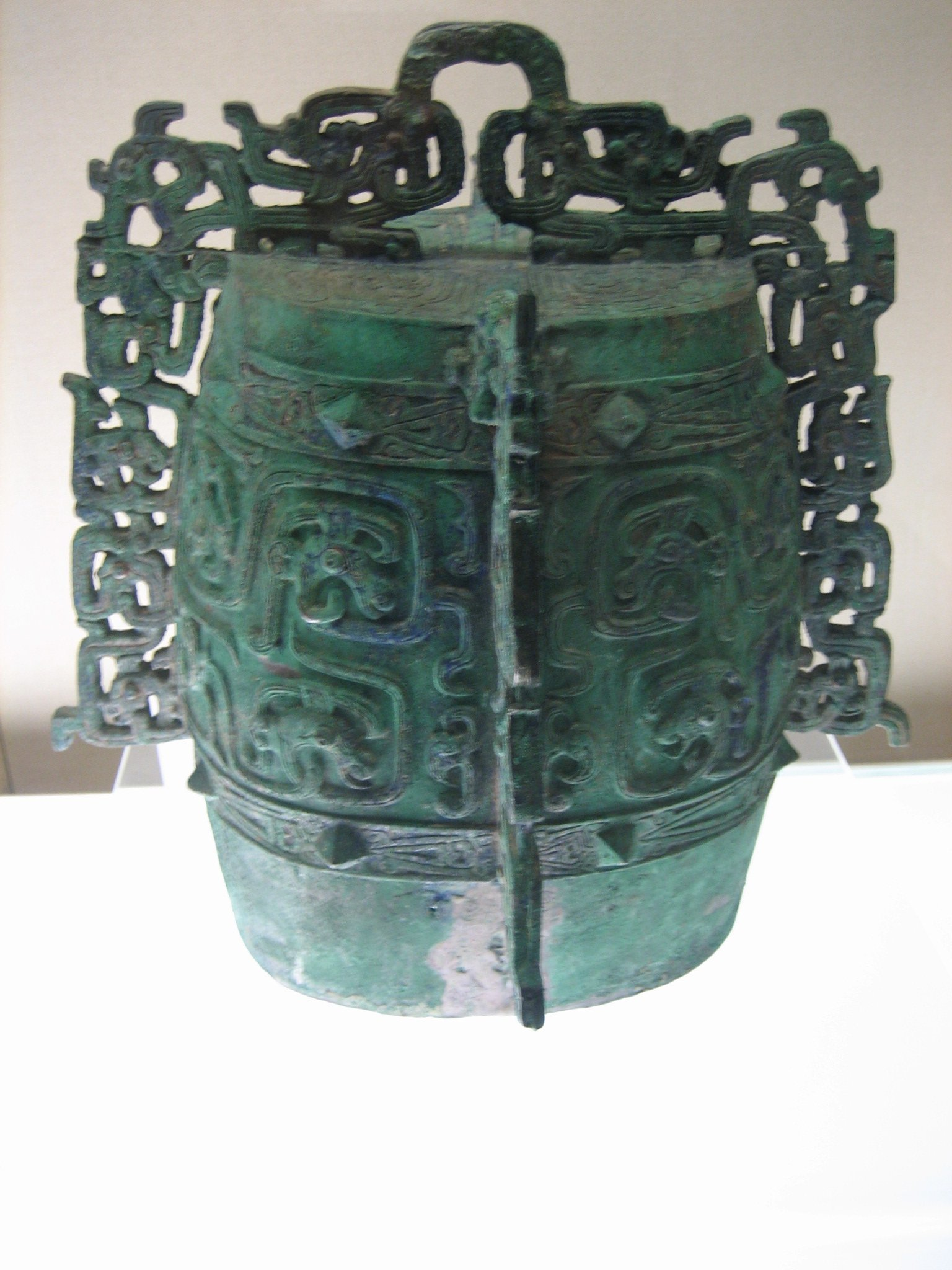
An ornate bronze bell belonging to Duke Mu of Qin (d. 621 BC) from the Spring and Autumn period (722–481 BC)

- Salt well: The Chinese have been using brine wells and a form of salt solution mining as part of their civilization for more than 2000 years. The first recorded salt well in China was dug in the Sichuan province about 2,250 years ago. This was the first time that ancient water well technology was applied successfully for the exploitation of salt, and marked the beginning of Sichuan's salt drilling industry. Shaft wells were sunk as early as 220 BC in the Sichuan and Yunnan provinces. By 1035 AD, Chinese in the Sichuan area were using percussion drilling to recover deep brines, a technique that would not be introduced to Europe and the Western World for another 600 to 800 years. Medieval and modern European travelers to China between 1400 and 1700 AD reported salt and natural gas production from dense networks of brine wells. Archaeological evidence of Song dynasty salt drilling tools used are kept and displayed in the Zigong Salt Industry Museum. Many of the wells were sunk deeper than 450 m and at least one well was more than 1000 meters deep. The medieval Venetian traveler to China Marco Polo reported an annual production in a single province of more than 30,000 tonnes of brine during his time there. According to Salt: A World History, a Qing dynasty well, also in Zigong, "continued down to 3,300 feet [1,000 m] making it at the time the deepest drilled well in the world."
- Seismometer: The Chinese polymath and inventor Zhang Heng (78–139) of the Han dynasty (202 BC – 220 AD) invented the first seismometer in 132, a large metal urn-shaped instrument which employed either a suspended pendulum or inverted pendulum acting on inertia (i.e. ground tremors from earthquakes) to dislodge a metal ball by a lever trip device; this ball would fall out of dragon-shaped metal mouth into the corresponding metal toad mouth indicating the exact cardinal direction of where a distant earthquake had occurred in order for the state to send swift aid and relief to the affected regions; several subsequent recreations of his device were employed by Chinese states up until the Tang dynasty (618–907), when use of the device fell into obscurity, a fact noted by the writer Zhou Mi about 1290, during the Yuan dynasty (1271–1368).
- Sky lantern: The Chinese military strategist, politician, writer, and inventor Zhuge Liang of the Three Kingdoms era is credited with its invention, and reportedly used it during military campaigns. According to the British scientist, historian, and sinologist Joseph Needham, sky lanterns have been used in China since the 3rd century BC. In 1783, the French entrepreneurs and inventors Joseph-Michel and Jacques-Etienne Montgolfier took part in the first modern manned hot air balloon flight.
- Snow gauge: The first use of snow gauges were precipitation gauges that was widely used in 1247 during the Southern Song dynasty to gather meteorological data. The Song Chinese mathematician and inventor Qin Jiushao records the use of gathering rain and snowfall measurements in the Song mathematical treatise Mathematical Treatise in Nine Sections. The book discusses the use of large conical or barrel-shaped snow gauges made from bamboo situated in mountain passes and uplands which are speculated to be first referenced to snow measurement.
- Solid-propellant rocket: The medieval Song dynasty Chinese invented the solid-propellant rocket at a time when bows, arrows, and catapult-based projectile launchers were state of the art military technology in medieval Europe. Illustrations and descriptions in the 14th century Chinese military treatise Huolongjing by the Ming dynasty military writer and philosopher Jiao Yu confirm that the Chinese in 1232 used proto-solid propellant rockets then known as "fire arrows" to drive back the Mongols during the Siege of Kaifeng. Each arrow took a primitive form of a simple, solid-propellant rocket tube that was filled gunpowder. One open end allowed the gas to escape and was attached to a long stick that acted as a guidance system for flight direction control.
- South-pointing chariot: Although the claim of Wei dynasty mechanical engineer and statesman Ma Jun (fl. 220–265) that the south-pointing chariot was first invented by the mythological Yellow Emperor are dubious, his south-pointing chariot was successfully designed and tested in 255 AD with many later models recreated in subsequent dynasties; this device was a wheeled vehicle with differential gears that ensured a mounted wooden figurine would always point in the southern direction no matter how the vehicle turned, in essence a non-magnetic compass. The Book of Song written in the 6th century states that the device was successfully reinvented by the mathematician and astronomer Zu Chongzhi (429–500) during the Liu Song dynasty (420–479). The Japanese historical text Nihon Shoki, compiled by 720, states that the device was crafted and presented as a gift to Emperor Tenji (661–672) on two different occasions (658 and 666) by the Tang dynasty (618–907) Chinese Buddhist monks Zhi Yu and Zhi You. The wheeled vehicle device was described in intricate detail in the historical text covering the Song dynasty (960–1279), i.e. the Song Shi (compiled 1345); for example, it revealed the number of gear teeth on each mechanical gear wheel, the diameter of each gear wheel, and how these gear wheels were properly positioned.
- Soybean oil: Chinese records from before 2000 BC mention the use of cultivated soybeans to produce edible soy oil. Ancient Chinese literature reveals that soybeans were extensively cultivated and highly valued as a use for the soybean oil production process before written records were kept.
- Soy sauce: Soy sauce in its current form was created about 2,200 years ago during the Western Han dynasty and was soon spread throughout East and Southeast Asia where it is used in cooking and as a condiment. The condiment considered almost as old as soy paste — a type of fermented paste (Jiang, 酱) obtained from soybeans — which had appeared during the Western Han dynasty and was listed in the bamboo slips found in the archaeological site Mawangdui.
- Steel made from cast iron through oxygenation: The earliest known production of steel is a piece of ironware excavated from an archaeological site in Anatolia (Kaman-Kalehoyuk) and is about 4,000 years old. Other ancient steel comes from East Africa, dating from 1400 BC. In the 4th century BC steel weapons like the Falcata were produced in the Iberian Peninsula, and Noric steel was used by the Roman military. The Chinese, who had been producing cast iron from the late Spring and Autumn period (722–481 BC), produced steel by the 2nd century BC through a process of decarburization, i.e. using bellows to pump large amounts of oxygen on to molten cast iron. This was first described in the Han dynasty (202 BC – 220 AD) book Huainanzi, compiled by scholars under Prince Liu An (179–122 BC). For steel, they used both quenching (i.e. rapid cooling) and tempering (i.e. slow cooling) methods of heat treatment. Much later, the American inventor William Kelly (1811–1888) brought four Chinese metallurgists to Eddyville, Kentucky in 1845, whose expertise in steelmaking influenced his ideas about air injection to reduce carbon content of iron; his invention anticipated the Bessemer process of English inventor Henry Bessemer (1813–1898).
- Stinkpot: The stinkpot was an earthenware incendiary weapon, part of which was filled with sulphur, gunpowder, nails, and shot, while the other part was filled with noxious materials designed to emanate a highly unpleasant and suffocating smell when ignited. The weapon was used in the 19th century during the Qing dynasty, where the British Admiral Sir William Robert Kennedy recorded the use of the stinkpot in 1856 during the Second Opium War in his book Hurrah for the Life of a Sailor – Fifty Years in the Royal Navy. These incendiary weapons were wrapped in calico bags and were then hoisted in a basket to the truck of the mast. When an enemy ship was alongside, one of the crew members would climb up the mast and primed the stinkpots with lighted joss sticks. The stinkpots were then launched onto the enemy deck by cutting the rope by which the basket had been hoisted. The ensuing noise, flying debris, and pungent smell it would create, would cause the enemy crew sufficient confusion and blow them into disarray.
- Stir frying: Stir frying is a Chinese cooking technique used for preparing food in a wok. It originates from the Han dynasty, but did not fully develop until the Song dynasty. Although there are no surviving records of Han dynasty stir frying, archaeological evidence of woks and the tendency to slice food thinly indicate that the technique was likely used for cooking. It was not until the Ming dynasty that stir frying was popularized as primary cooking method of Chinese cuisine. Stir frying was brought to America by early Chinese immigrants, and has been used for non-Asian cuisines.
- Suspension bridge using iron chains: Although there is evidence that many early cultures had suspension bridges with cabled ropes, the first written evidence of iron-chain suspension bridges comes from a local history and topography of Yunnan written in the 15th century, which describes the repair of an iron-chain bridge during the reign of the Yongle Emperor (r. 1402–1424); although Ming dynasty (1368–1644) Chinese claims that iron-chain suspension bridges had existed since the Han dynasty are questionable, their existence in the 15th century is the earliest known anywhere. K. S. Tom mentions this same repaired Ming suspension bridge described by Needham, and adds that recent research has revealed a document that lists the names of those said to have built an iron chain suspension bridge in Yunnan about AD 600.

=== T ===
- Tangram: The tangram is a dissection puzzle consisting of seven flat shapes, which are put together to form shapes. The objective of the puzzle is to form a specific shape using all seven pieces, which may not overlap. The game is reputed to have been invented in China during the Song dynasty, and was popularized in Europe and United States during the 19th century. The word tangram is likely derived from two words, the Chinese word tang, referring to the medieval Tang dynasty, and the Greek word gramma, a synonym of "graph".
- Tea: The tea plant is indigenous to western Yunnan; it is thought that by the mid 2nd millennium BC, tea was consumed in Yunnan for medicinal purposes, but the earliest physical evidence (discovered in 2016) comes from the tomb of Emperor Jing of Han, dated to the 2nd century BC. Tea drinking was already an established custom in the daily life in this area as shown by the Contract with a Slave, written by Wang Bao in 59 BC, the first source to mention boiling of tea. This written record also reveals that tea was processed and used as a drink instead of a medicinal herb, emerged no later than the 1st century BC. Early Chinese tea culture began from the time of Han dynasty (202 BC – 220 AD) to the Northern and Southern dynasties (420–589) when tea was widely used by Chinese gentry, but only took its initial shape during the Tang dynasty (618–907).
- Teapot: The teapot was invented during the Yuan dynasty, tea preparation in previous dynasties did not utilize a teapot. In the Tang dynasty, a cauldron was used to boil ground tea, which was served in bowls. Song dynasty tea was made by pouring water boiled using a kettle into a bowl with finely ground tea leaves. A brush was then used to stir the tea. The innovation of the teapot, a vessel that steeps tea leaves in boiling water, occurs during the late Yuan dynasty. Written evidence of a teapot appears in the Yuan dynasty text, Jiyuan Conghua, which describes a teapot that the author, Cai Shizhan, bought from the scholar Sun Daoming. By the Ming dynasty, teapots were widespread in China.
- Thyroid hormones to treat goiters: In 239 BC, Master Lu's Spring and Autumn Annals stated that where water is too light, people suffer widespread baldness and goiter. It was not until the 1860 that French physician Gaspard Adolphe Chatin (1813–1901) linked goiter with the lack of iodine in soil and water; iodine was discovered in the thyroid gland in 1896 by German chemist Eugen Baumann, and thyroid extract was used to treat patients in 1890. The Tang dynasty (618–907) physician Zhen Quan (d. 643 AD), in his Old and New Tried and Tested Prescriptions, stated that the thyroid glands taken from gelded rams were used to treat patients with goiter; the thyroid hormones could be swallowed in pill form (the body of the pill made from crushed jujube pulp) or as a solid thyroid gland with the fat taken off. The Pharmacopoeia of the Heavenly Husbandman asserted that iodine-rich sargassum was used to treat goiter by the 1st century BC (Ge Hong, 284–364, also suggested using a tincture derived from sargassum seaweed in about 340 AD), a treatment later recorded in the Western World by Italian practrica Roger of Palermo in his Practica Chirurgiae of 1180 AD.
- Tofu: Although both popular tradition and Song dynasty philosophers like Zhu Xi (1130–1200 AD) credit the invention of tofu—along with soymilk— to Liu An (179–122 BC), a Han dynasty King of Huainan, no mention of tofu is found in the extant Huainanzi (compiled under Liu An). The earliest known mention of tofu was made in Records of the Extraordinary (Qingyi lu 清異錄), which reported that tofu was sold at Qingyang (Anhui). The earliest explanation of how to make tofu is found in the Bencao Gangmu, written by the Ming dynasty polymath Li Shizhen (1518–1593). According to Liu Keshun (1999), Liu An's process for making tofu was essentially the same as today.
- Toilet paper: Toilet paper was first mentioned by the Sui Chinese politician and artist Yan Zhitui (531–591) in the year 589 during the Sui dynasty, with full evidence of continual use in subsequent dynasties. By the mid 14th century during the Yuan dynasty (1271–1368), it was written that ten million packages of 1,000 to 10,000 sheets of toilet paper were manufactured annually in Zhejiang province alone.
- Traction trebuchet: The earliest type of trebuchet catapult was the traction trebuchet, developed first in China by the 5th or 4th century BC, the beginning of the Warring States period (403–221 BC); to operate the trebuchet, a team of men pulled on ropes attached to the butt of the shorter segment of a long wooden beam separated by a rotating axle fixed to a base framework, allowing the longer segment of the beam to lunge forward and use its sling to hurl a missile; by the 9th century a hybrid of the traction and counterweight trebuchet, employing manpower and a pivoting weight, was used in the Middle East, Mediterranean Basin, and Northern Europe; by the 12th century, the full-fledged counterweight trebuchet was developed under the Ayyubid dynasty of Islamic Syria and Egypt (described by Mardi bin Ali al-Tarsusi) and used in the Third Crusade; by the 13th century, the counterweight trebuchet found its way into Song dynasty (960–1279) China via the Mongol invaders under Kublai Khan (r. 1260–1294) who used it in the Siege of Xiangyang (1267–1273).
- Trip hammer: The ancient Chinese used pestle and mortar to pound and decorticate grain, which was superseded by the treadle-operated tilt hammer (employing a simple lever and fulcrum) perhaps during the Zhou dynasty (1122–256 BC) but first described in a Han dynasty (202 BC – 220 AD) dictionary of 40 BC and soon after by the Han dynasty philosopher and writer Yang Xiong (53 BC – 18 AD) in his Fangyan dictionary written in 15 BC; the next stage in this evolution of grain-pounding devices was to apply hydraulic power, which the Han dynasty philosopher and writer Huan Tan (43 BC – 28 AD) mentioned in his Xinlun of 20 AD, although he also described trip hammers powered by the labor of horses, oxen, donkeys, and mules. After Huan Tan's book was written, numerous references to trip hammers powered by waterwheels were made in subsequent Chinese dynasties and in medieval Europe by the 12th century. However, trip hammers were also attested by both literary (Pliny, Natural History 18.97) and archaeological evidence in fairly widespread use in the Roman Empire by the 1st century AD.
- Tuned bells: The earliest complete set of tuned bells, sixteen in all, were found in Tomb 8 of Marquis Su of Jin at Qucun, southern Shanxi. The tomb has been dated by AMS radiocarbon techniques to 815–786 BC, during the period of the Zhou dynasty. Of the sixty-four bronze bells found in the tomb of Marquis Yi of Zeng interred by 433 BC, forty-seven of them produce two notes with minor third intervals and sixteen produce two notes with major third intervals.
- Tung oil: The tung oil tree originates in southern China and was cultivated there for tung oil, but the date of cultivation remains unknown. During the Song dynasty, tung oil was used for waterproofing on ships. Tung oil is etymologically derived from the Chinese tongyou. The earliest references for Chinese use of tung oil is in the writings of Confucius around 500 to 400 BC The Chinese have used tung oil, also known as China wood oil, for at least 2500 years for building waterproof boats and paper parasols, wood finishing, wood waterproofing, caulking, inks and paints.

=== W ===
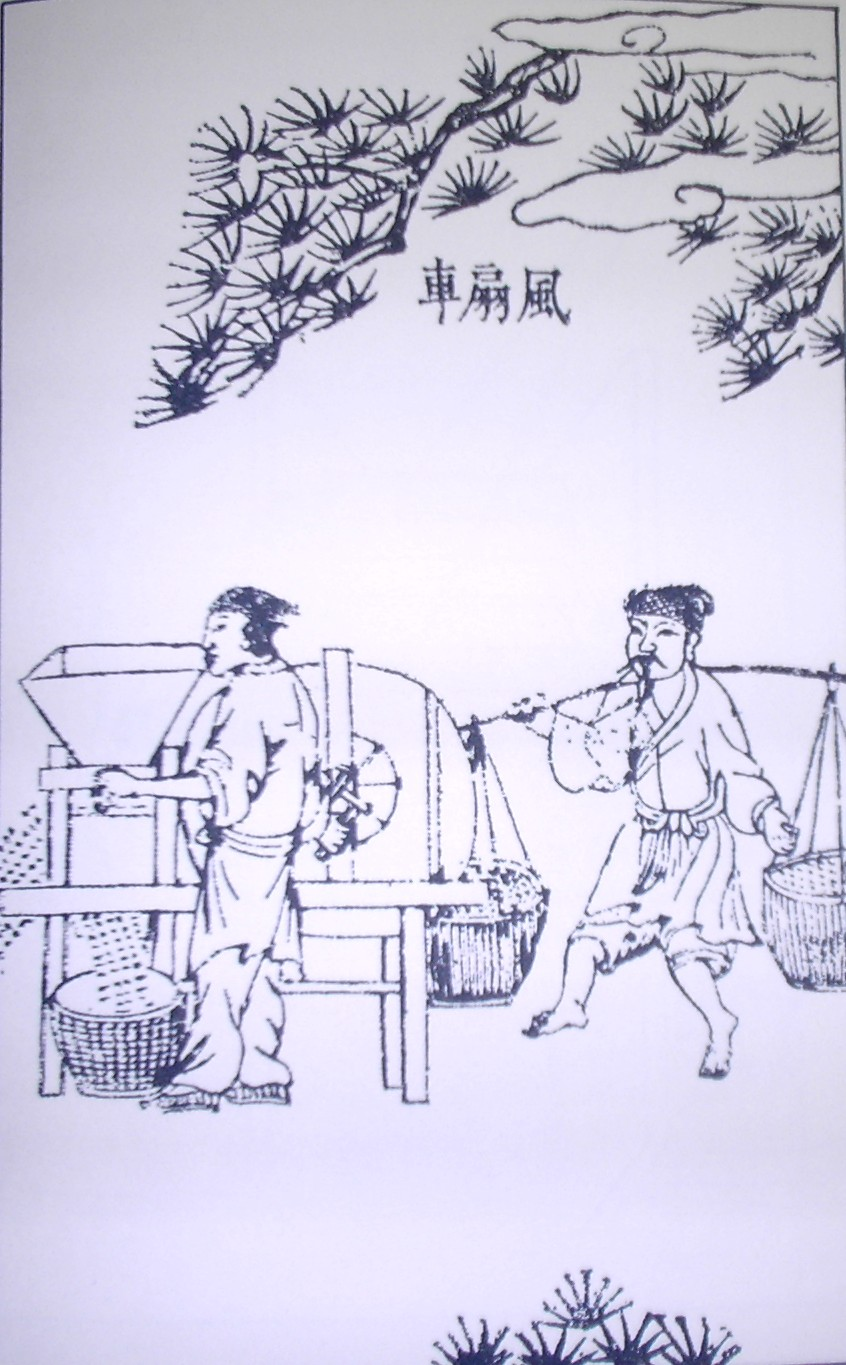
Chinese rotary fan winnowing machine, from an encyclopedia published in 1637 by Song Yingxing

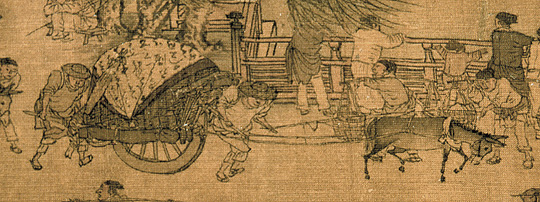
The one-wheeled Chinese wheelbarrow, from the Song dynasty painter Zhang Zeduan's (1085–1145) painting Along the River During Qingming Festival, Song dynasty.

- Well drilling: The earliest record of well-drilling dates from AD 347, in China. Petroleum was used in ancient China for "lighting, as a lubricant for cart axles and the bearings of water-powered drop hammers, as a source of carbon for inksticks, and as a medical remedy for sores on humans and mange in animals." In ancient China, deep well drilling machines were in the forefront of brine well production by the 1st century BC. The ancient Chinese developed advanced sinking wells and were the first civilization to use a well-drilling machine and to use bamboo well casings to keep the holes open.
- Well-field system: The well-field system was a Chinese land-distribution method used from the ninth century BC (late Western Zhou dynasty) to about the end of the Warring States period. Its name comes from Chinese character 井 (jǐng), which means 'well' and looks like the # symbol; this character represents the theoretical appearance of land division: a square area of land was divided into nine identically sized sections; the eight outer sections (私田; sītián) were privately cultivated by serfs and the center section (公田; gōngtián) was communally cultivated on behalf of the landowning aristocrat.
- Wheat gluten: The earliest description of wheat gluten comes from 6th century China. It was widely consumed by the Chinese as a substitute for meat, especially among adherents of Buddhism. The oldest reference to wheat gluten appears in the Qimin Yaoshu, a Chinese agricultural encyclopedia written by Jia Sixie in 535. The encyclopedia mentions noodles prepared from wheat gluten called bo duo. Wheat gluten was known as mian jin by the Song dynasty (960–1279).
- Wheelbarrow: The earliest wheelbarrows with archaeological evidence in the form of a one-wheel cart come from 2nd century Han dynasty Emperor Hui's tomb murals and brick tomb reliefs. The painted tomb mural of a man pushing a wheelbarrow was found in a tomb at Chengdu, Sichuan province, dated precisely to AD 118. The stone carved relief of a man pushing a wheelbarrow was found in the tomb of Shen Fujun in Sichuan province, dated about AD 150. And then there is the story of the pious Dong Yuan pushing his father around in a single-wheel lu che barrow, depicted in a mural of the Wu Liang tomb-shrine of Shandong (dated to AD 147). However, there are even earlier accounts than this that date from the 1st century BC and the 1st century AD. The 5th century Book of Later Han stated that the wife of the once poor and youthful imperial censor Bao Xuan helped him push a lu che back to his village during their feeble wedding ceremony, about 30 BC. Later, during the Red Eyebrows Rebellion (about AD 20) against Xin dynasty's Wang Mang (45 BC – AD 23), the official Zhao Xi saved his wife from danger by disguising himself and pushing her along in his lu che barrow, past a group of brigand rebels who questioned him, and allowed him to pass after he convinced them that his wife was terribly ill. The first recorded description of a wheelbarrow appears in Liu Xiang's work Lives of Famous Immortals. Liu describes the invention of the wheelbarrow by the legendary Chinese mythological figure Ko Yu, who builds a "Wooden ox".
- Winnowing machine, rotary fan: Contemporary to the rotary air conditioning fan invented by Han dynasty mechanical engineer Ding Huan (fl. 180 AD) is a pottery tomb model of a crank-operated rotary winnowing fan from the Han dynasty, used for separating chaff from grain. The winnowing fan was first described by the Tang dynasty writer and linguist Yan Shigu (581–645), in his commentary on the Jijiupian dictionary written earlier in 40 BC by Shi Yu; it was also mentioned in a poem by the Song dynasty artist Mei Yaochen in about 1060. The earliest known drawn illustration of the winnowing fan comes from the Book of Agriculture published in 1313 by Yuan dynasty inventor and politician Wang Zhen (fl. 1290–1333).
- Wrapping paper and paper envelope: The use of wrapping paper is first documented in ancient China, where paper was invented in the 2nd century BC. In the Southern Song dynasty, monetary gifts were wrapped with paper, forming an envelope known as a chih pao. The wrapped gifts were distributed by the Chinese court to government officials. In the Chinese text Thien Kung Khai Wu, Sung Ying-Hsing states that the coarsest wrapping paper is manufactured with rice straws and bamboo fiber. Although the Hall brothers Rollie and Joyce Hall, founders of Hallmark Cards, did not invent gift wrapping, their innovations led to the development of modern gift wrapping. They helped to popularize the idea of decorative gift wrapping in the 20th century, and according to Joyce Hall, "the decorative gift-wrapping business was born the day Rollie placed those French envelope linings on top of that showcase."

=== X ===
- Xiangqi (See also: List of Chinese inventions#L – Liubo): The exact origins of the Chinese chess board game known as xiangqi are ambiguous. Historian David H. Li asserts that it was first invented by Han Xin (d. 196 BC), a renowned military general of the early Han dynasty who fell victim to a purge instigated by Empress Lü Zhi (d. 180 BC). Li states that it was revived under a different, camouflaged name of xiangxi by Emperor Wu of Northern Zhou (r. 561–578), which to this day has made the two terms synonymous and interchangeable for the same game.

== Modern (1912–present) ==
- Artemisinin, Tu Youyou, Project 523, Dihydroartemisinin. Derivative of Qing Hao herb originally identified many years earlier by the ancient Chinese medic - Ge Hong. Tested on Tu Youyou herself during the cultural revolution, shown to be effective against P. falciparum, the cause of malaria.
- Electronic cigarette (vape): Hon Lik, a Chinese pharmacist, is credited with the invention of the modern electronic cigarette. In 2003, he came up with the idea of using a piezoelectric ultrasound-emitting element to vaporise a pressurized jet of liquid containing nicotine diluted in a propylene glycol solution. This design produces a smoke-like vapour that can be inhaled and provides a vehicle for nicotine delivery into the bloodstream via the lungs. He also proposed using propylene glycol to dilute nicotine and placing it in a disposable plastic cartridge which serves as a liquid reservoir and mouthpiece.
- Foldable smartphones:Chinese startup Royole released the first commercially available foldable smartphone with an OLED display, the Royole Flexpai. It featured a single 7.8-inch display that folds outwards, leaving the display exposed when folded.
- Generation IV reactor: China was the first country to operate a demonstration generation-IV nuclear reactor, the HTR-PM in 2021. The reactor subsequently became the first fourth generation reactor to enter commercial service in 2023.
- Non-invasive prenatal diagnostic testing for Down Syndrome: Previously, women underwent invasive testing such as amniocentesis or chorionic villus sampling (CVS). This new maternal blood test has the potential to reduce the number of women referred for invasive testing for Down syndrome by 98 percent. Developed by Chinese researchers in Hong Kong in 2008, this is hailed as a breakthrough.
- Passenger drone: The world's first passenger drone, a drone capable of carrying human cargo, Ehang 184 was unveiled at the Computer Electronics Show (CES) 2016 by Chinese entrepreneurs.
- Synthetic bovine insulin: In 1965, Chinese scientists synthesized bovine insulin, with the "same crystalline form and biological activities as natural insulin." The project began in 1958, and is considered one of the "first proteins ever synthesized in vitro".
- Stem cell educator therapy: Chinese and US researchers have produced remarkable results for this new treatment of obtaining stem cells from human cord blood to "re-educate" misbehaving immune cells. This result was published in the open-access journal BMC Medicine in January 2012, and offers hope for Type 1 diabetics and potentially may also be used to treat other auto-immune diseases if the approach lives up to early promise.
- Straw checkerboard: A technique used for fixing sand dunes to fight desertification, it was conceived at the Shapotou Desert Research Station of the Chinese Academy of Sciences in 1955 with first planting carried out in 1956.
- Quantum communication satellite: Launched in 2016, QUESS, or Micius, is the world's first quantum communication satellite. It enables secure communication using quantum key distribution (QKD) and entangled photons, transmitted over 1,200 km, demonstrating the potential for unbreakable encryption.

== See also ==
- Chinese exploration
- History of Chinese archaeology
- History of science in Classical Antiquity
- History of science and technology in China
- History of typography in East Asia
- List of China-related topics
- List of Chinese discoveries
- List of Japanese inventions
- List of Korean inventions
- List of Taiwanese inventions and discoveries
- Science and technology of the Han Dynasty
- Technology of the Song Dynasty
