= Moveable =

Moveable may refer to:

- A Moveable Feast
- Moveable feast
- Movable type
- Moveable bridge
- History of printing in East Asia

== See also ==
- Personal property
