= Bi Sheng (crater) =

Lunar crater

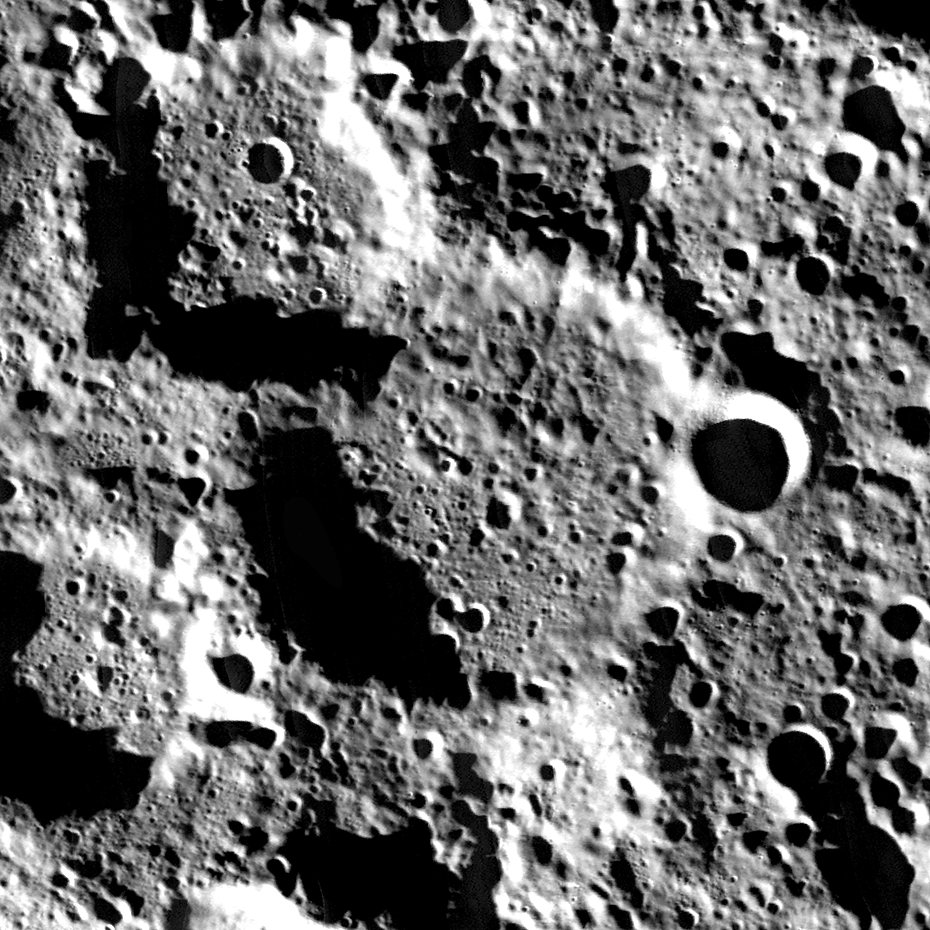
- Image of Bi Sheng crater from the Lunar Reconnaissance Orbiter
- Coordinates: 78.35°N 148.46°E
- Diameter: 55.27 km (34.34 mi)
- Depth: Unknown
- Eponym: Bi Sheng

Bi Sheng is an impact crater located in the north on the far side of the Moon. This is a worn and degraded crater. There is a gap in the northwest rim where the floor is connected to a similar but smaller formation to the west, creating a figure eight. A smaller bowl-shaped crater overlays the eastern rim. Seares crater is located due south. Bi Sheng has a diameter of 55.27 kilometers.

This crater was named after Bi Sheng (died 1051), a Chinese inventor who is credited with the invention of moveable type. Its designation was formally adopted by the International Astronomical Union on August 2, 2010.
