= Bi Sheng =

Chinese inventor of moveable type (972–1051)

- Traditional Chinese: 畢昇
- Simplified Chinese: 毕昇
Transcriptions
Standard Mandarin
- Hanyu Pinyin: Bì Shēng
- Wade–Giles: Pi^{4} Sheng^{1}
- IPA: [pî ʂə́ŋ]
Yue: Cantonese
- Yale Romanization: Bāt Sīng
- Jyutping: Bat1 Sing1
- IPA: [pɐt̚˥ sɪŋ˥]

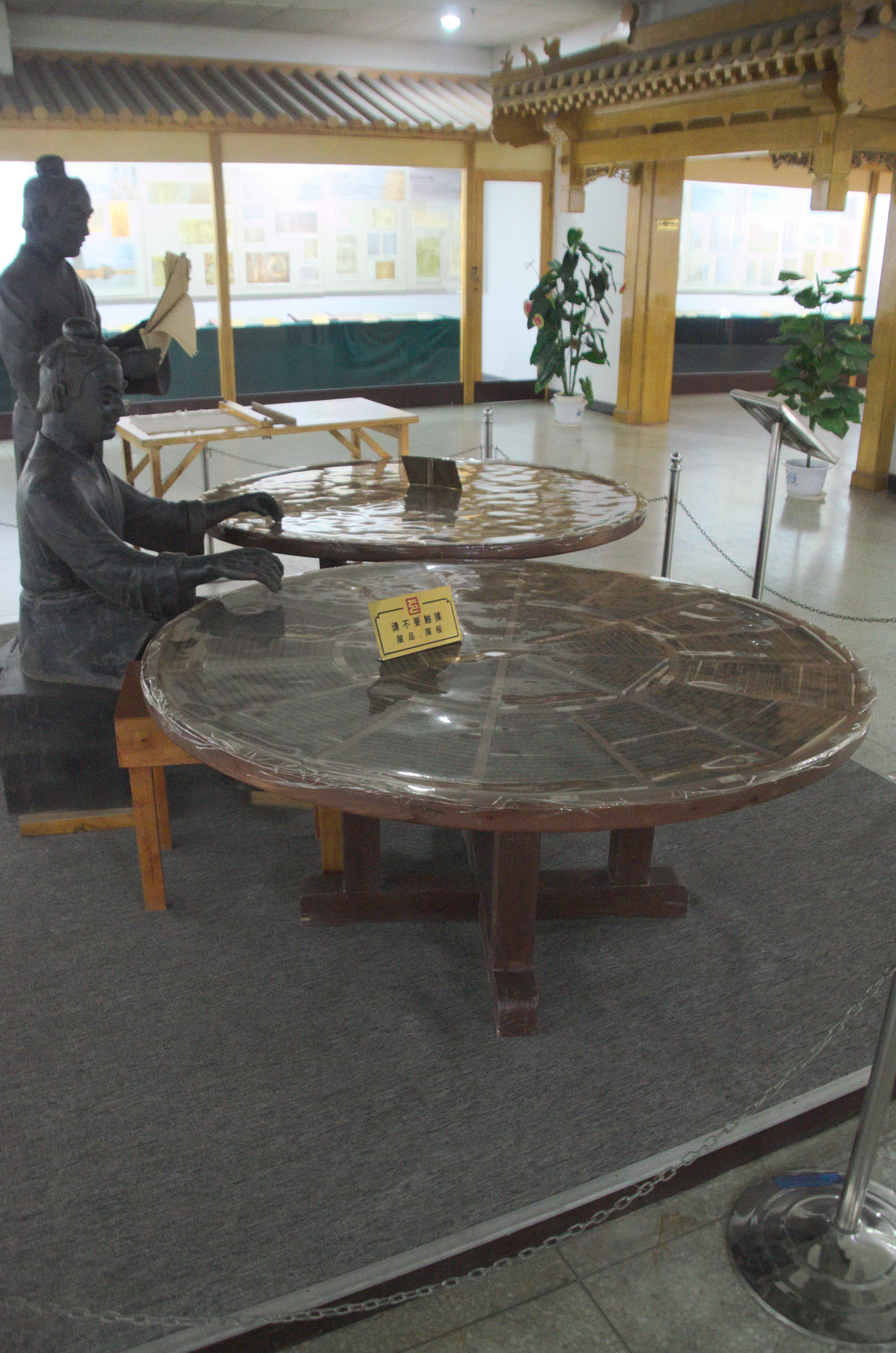
Bi Sheng and his invention at the China Printing Museum in Beijing

Bi Sheng (died 1051) was a Chinese artisan and engineer during the Song dynasty (960–1279), who invented the world's first movable type. Bi's system used fired clay tiles, one for each Chinese character, and was invented between 1039 and 1048. Printing was one of the Four Great Inventions. Because Bi was a commoner, not an educated person, little is known about his life besides this invention.

== Movable type printing ==
Bi Sheng's invention was only recorded in the Dream Pool Essays by Chinese scholar-official and polymath Shen Kuo (1031–1095). The book provides a detailed description of the technical details of Bi Sheng's invention of movable type printing:

During the reign of Chingli 慶曆 (Qìnglì), 1041–1048, Bi Sheng, a man of unofficial position, made movable type. His method was as follows: He prepared an iron plate. Then he took sticky clay and cut in its characters as thin as the edge of a coin. Each character formed, as it were, a single type. He baked them in the fire to make them hard. He had covered the plate with a mixture of pine resin, wax, and paper ashes. When he wished to print, he took an iron frame and set it on the iron plate. In this, he placed the types, set close together. When the frame was full, the whole made one solid block of type. He then placed it near the fire to warm it. When the paste [at the back] was slightly melted, he took a smooth board and pressed it over the surface, so that the block of type became as even as a whetstone.

If one were to print only two or three copies, this method would be neither simple nor easy. But for printing hundreds or thousands of copies, it was marvelously quick. As a rule he kept two formes going. While the impression was being made from the one forme, the type was being put in place on the other. When the printing of the one forme was finished, the other was then ready. In this way the two formes alternated and the printing was done with great rapidity.

For each character, there were several types, and for certain common characters, there were twenty or more types each, in order to be prepared for the repetition of characters on the same page. When the characters were not in use he had them arranged with paper labels, one label for each rhyme-group, and kept them in wooden cases.

Bi Sheng also developed wooden movable type, but it was abandoned in favor of ceramic types due to the presence of wood grains and the unevenness of the wooden type after being soaked in ink.

After his death, ceramic movable type may have spread to the Tangut kingdom of Western Xia, where a Buddhist text known as the Vimalakirti Nirdesa Sutra was found in modern Wuwei, Gansu, dating to the reign of Emperor Renzong of Western Xia (r. 1125-1193). The text features traits that have been identified as hallmarks of clay movable type such as the hollowness of the character strokes and deformed and broken strokes. The ceramic movable-type also passed onto Bi Sheng's descendants. The next mention of movable type occurred in 1193 when a Southern Song chief counselor, Zhou Bida (周必大), attributed the movable-type method of printing to Shen Kuo. However Shen Kuo did not invent the movable type but credited it to Bi Sheng in his Dream Pool Essays. The ceramic movable type was also mentioned by Kublai Khan's councilor Yao Shu, who convinced his pupil Yang Gu to print language primers using this method.

The government official Wang Zhen (fl. 1290–1333) improved Bi Sheng's clay types by innovation through the wood, as his process increased the speed of typesetting as well.

By 1490, bronze movable type was developed by the wealthy printer Hua Sui (1439–1513).

Wooden movable-type printing became widespread in the Qing dynasty (1644–1912), but did not replace woodblock printing, probably because of the expense of creating a font of so many pieces or the low cost of a copyist.

== Legacy ==
His gravestone was located in Hubei province in 1990. A park and museum opened on that site in April 2023.

Bisheng Subdistrict (畢昇社區) in Wenquan, Huanggang, Hubei is named for Bi Sheng. The Bi Sheng crater located in the LAC-7 quadrant near the northern pole on the far side of the Moon was named after Bi Sheng by the IAU on August 2, 2010.

He also appears in a commemorative stamp by the Liberian post office due to his invention of movable printing.

== See also ==
- History of printing in East Asia
- Woodblock printing
- Johannes Gutenberg

== Sources ==
- Needham, Joseph; Tsien, Tsuen-hsuin, eds. (1985). Chemistry and Chemical Technology: Paper and Printing. Science and Civilisation in China. Vol. V:1. Cambridge University Press. ISBN 978-0-521-08690-5.
- Qi, Han (2015), Lecture 2 Printing, Springer
- Wilkinson, Endymion (2012), Chinese History: A New Manual, Harvard University Asia Center for the Harvard-Yenching Institute
- Wilkinson, Endymion (2022) [1973]. Chinese History: A New Manual. Cambridge, MA: Harvard University Press. p. 1031. ISBN 978-0-674-26018-4.
