= Wang Zhen (inventor) =

Officer and inventor

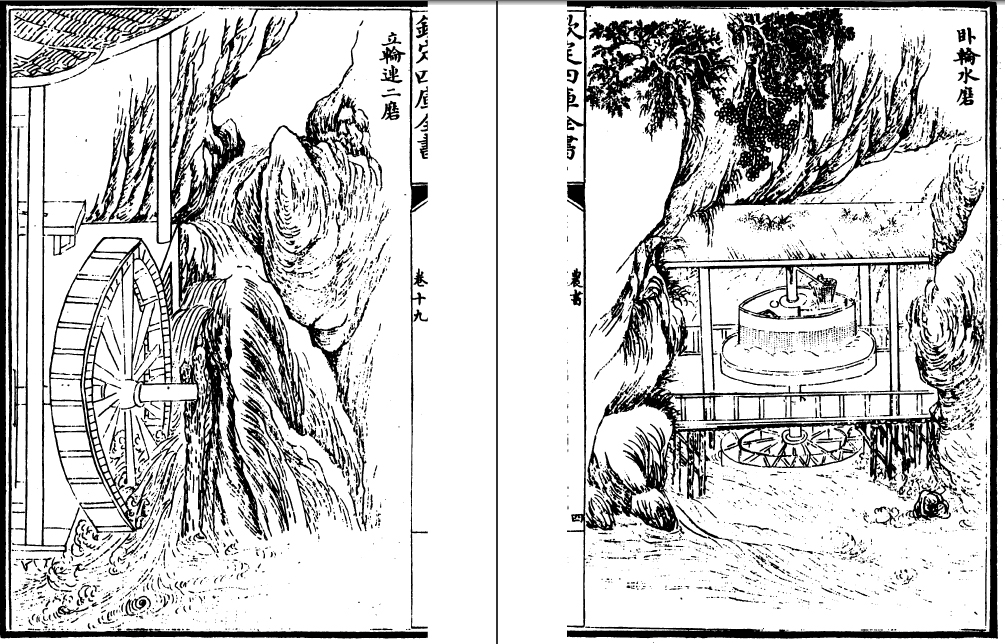
Watermills in Wang Zhen's Nong Shu, volume 19

Wang Zhen (simplified Chinese: 王祯; traditional Chinese: 王禎; pinyin: Wáng Zhēn; Wade–Giles: Wang Chen, fl. 1290–1333) was a Chinese agronomist, inventor, mechanical engineer, politician, and writer of the Yuan dynasty (1271–1368). He was one of the early innovators of the wooden movable type printing technology. His illustrated agricultural treatise was also one of the most advanced of its day, covering a wide range of equipment and technologies available in the late 13th and early 14th century.

== Life and works ==
Wang Zhen was born in Shandong province, and spent many years as an official of both Anhui and Jiangxi provinces. From 1290 to 1301, he was a magistrate for Jingde, Anhui province, where he was a pioneer of the use of wooden movable type printing. The wooden movable type was described in Wang Zhen's publication of 1313, known as the Nong Shu (農書), or Book of Agriculture. Although the title describes the main focus of the work, it incorporated much more information on a wide variety of subjects that was not limited to the scope of agriculture. Wang's Nong Shu of 1313 was a very important medieval treatise outlining the application and use of the various Chinese sciences, technologies, and agricultural practices. From water-powered bellows to movable type printing, it is considered a descriptive masterpiece on contemporary medieval Chinese technology.

Wang wrote the masterpiece Nong Shu for many practical reasons, but also as a means to aid and support destitute rural farmers in China looking for means to improve their economic livelihoods in the face of poverty and oppression during the Yuan period. Although the previous Song dynasty was a period of high Chinese culture and relative economic and agricultural stability, the Yuan dynasty thoroughly damaged the economic and agricultural base of China during the Song–Yuan transition. Hence, a book such as the Nong Shu could help rural farmers maximize efficiency of producing yields and they could learn how to use various agricultural tools to aid their daily lives. However, it was not intended to be read by rural farmers (who were largely illiterate), but local officials who desired to research the best agricultural methods currently available that the peasants otherwise would know little of.

The Nong Shu was an incredibly long book even for its own time, which had over 110,000 written Chinese characters. However, this was only slightly larger than the early medieval Chinese agricultural treatise Qimin Yaoshu written by Jia Sixia in 535, which had slightly over 100,000 written Chinese characters.

== Technological innovations ==
=== Water-powered bellows ===
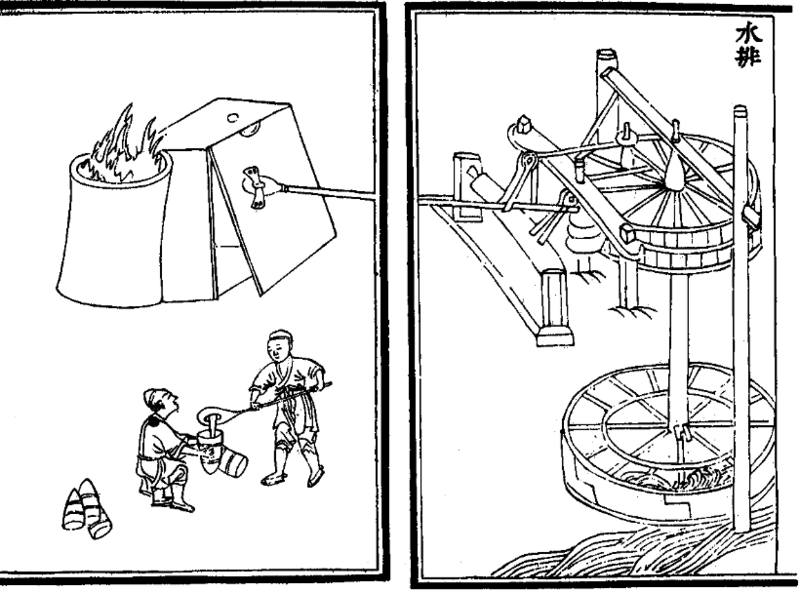
An illustration of furnace bellows operated by waterwheels, from the Nong Shu, by Wang Zhen, 1313, during the Mongol Yuan dynasty.

The Chinese, during the Han dynasty (202 BC – AD 220), were the first to apply hydraulic power (i.e. a waterwheel) in working the inflatable bellows of the blast furnace in creating cast iron. This was recorded in AD 31, an innovation of the engineer Du Shi, Prefect of Nanyang. After Du Shi, Chinese in subsequent dynastic periods continued the use of water power to operate the bellows of the blast furnace. In the 5th century text of the Wu Chang Ji, its author Pi Ling wrote that a planned, artificial lake had been constructed in the Yuan-Jia reign period (424–429) for the sole purpose of powering water wheels aiding the smelting and casting processes of the Chinese iron industry. The 5th-century text Shui Jing Zhu mentions the use of rushing river water to power waterwheels, as does the Tang dynasty geography text of the Yuan-he Jun Xian Tu Chi, written in 814.

Although Du Shi was the first to apply water power to bellows in metallurgy, the first drawn and printed illustration of its operation with water power came in 1313, with Wang Zhen's Nong Shu. Wang explained the methods used for the water-powered blast-furnace in previous times and in his era of the 14th century:

According to modern study (+1313!), leather bag bellows were used in olden times, but now they always use wooden fan (bellows). The design is as follows. A place beside a rushing torrent is selected, and a vertical shaft is set up in a framework with two horizontal wheels so that the lower one is rotated by the force of the water. The upper one is connected by a driving-belt to a (smaller) wheel in front of it, which bears an eccentric lug (lit. oscillating rod). Then all as one, following the turning (of the driving wheel), the connecting-rod attached to the eccentric lug pushes and pulls the rocking roller, the levers to left and right of which assure the transmission of the motion to the piston-rod. Thus this is pushed back and forth, operating the furnace bellows far more quickly than would be possible with man-power.

Another method is also used. At the end of the wooden (piston-)rod, about 3 ft long, which comes out from the front of the bellows, there is set up right a curved piece of wood shaped like the crescent of the new moon, and (all) this is suspended from above by a rope like those of a swing. Then in front of the bellows there are strong bamboo (springs) connected with it by ropes; this is what controls the motion of the fan of the bellows. Then in accordance with the turning of the (vertical) water-wheel, the lug fixed on the driving-shaft automatically presses upon and pushes the curved board (attached to the piston-rod), which correspondingly moves back (lit. inwards). When the lug has finally come down, the bamboo (springs) act on the bellows and restore it to its original position. In like manner, using one main drive it is possible to actuate several bellows (by lugs on the shaft), on the same principle as the water trip-hammers. This is also very convenient and quick...

According to Joseph Needham, Wang Zhen's blowing engine is one of "the two machines of the Middle Ages which lie most directly in the line of ancestry of the steam-engine and the locomotive" along with Al-Jazari's slot-rod force pump a century earlier.

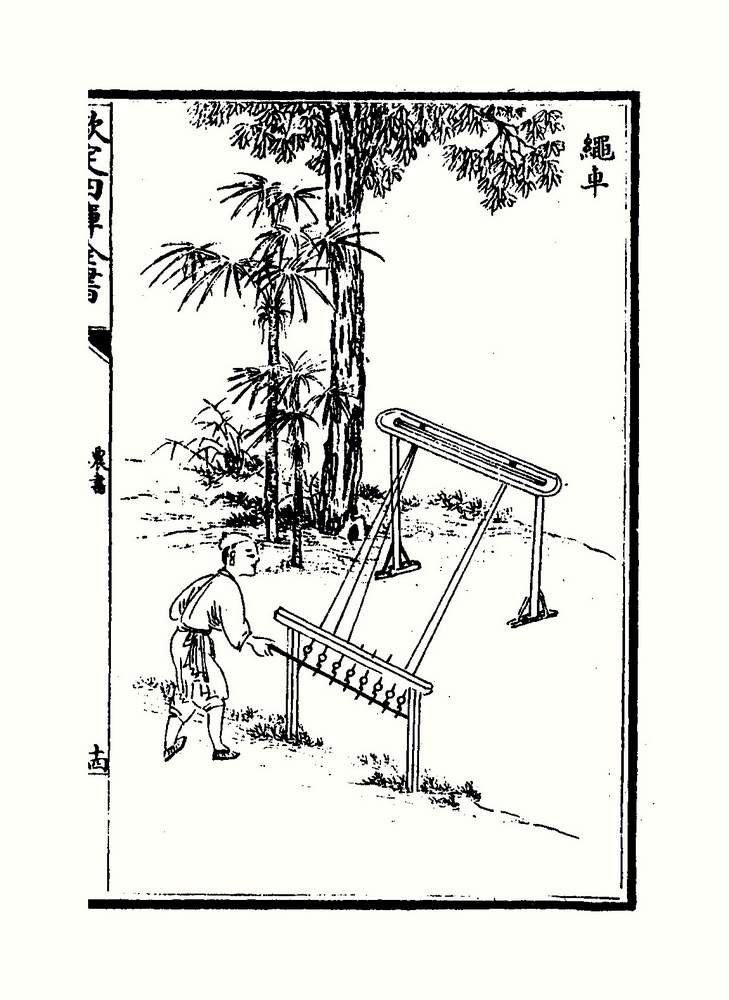

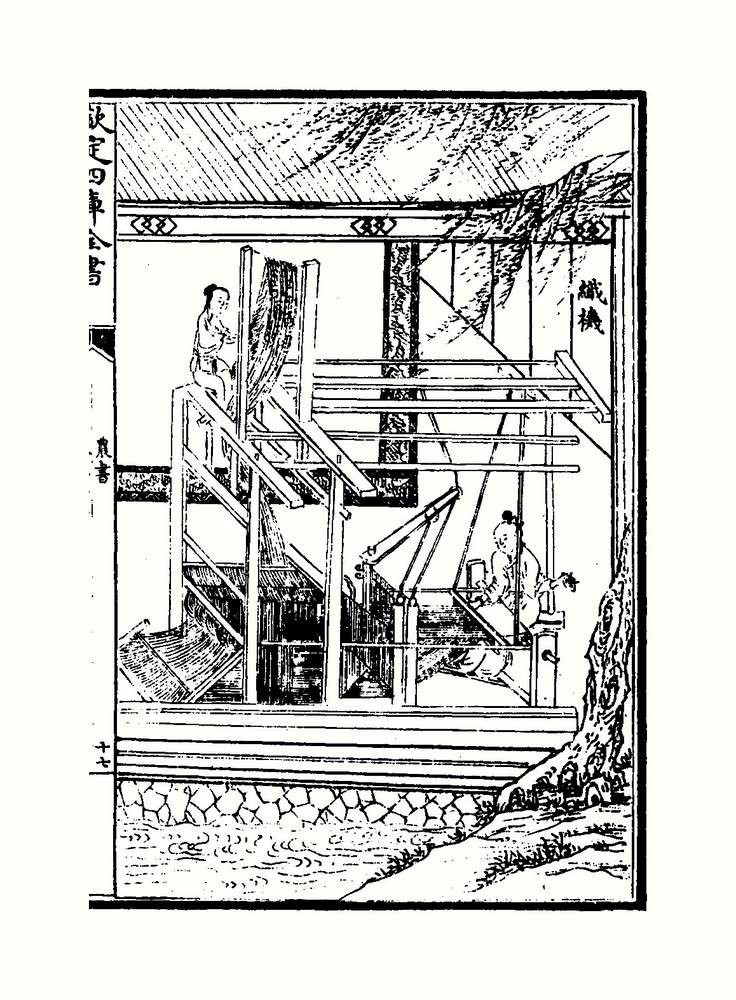

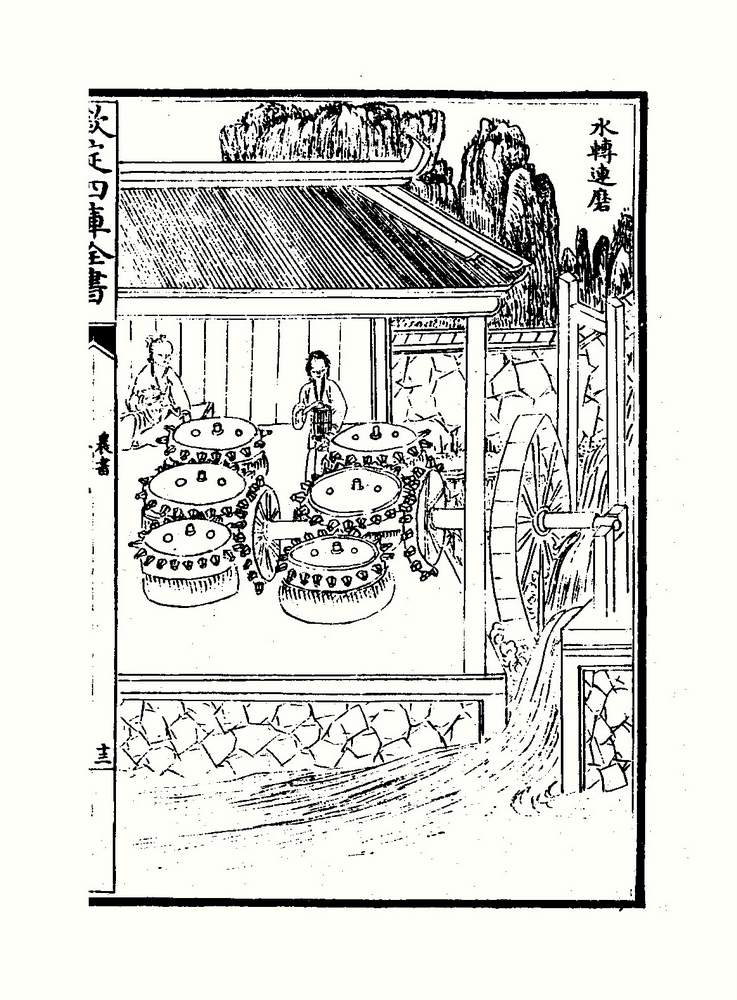

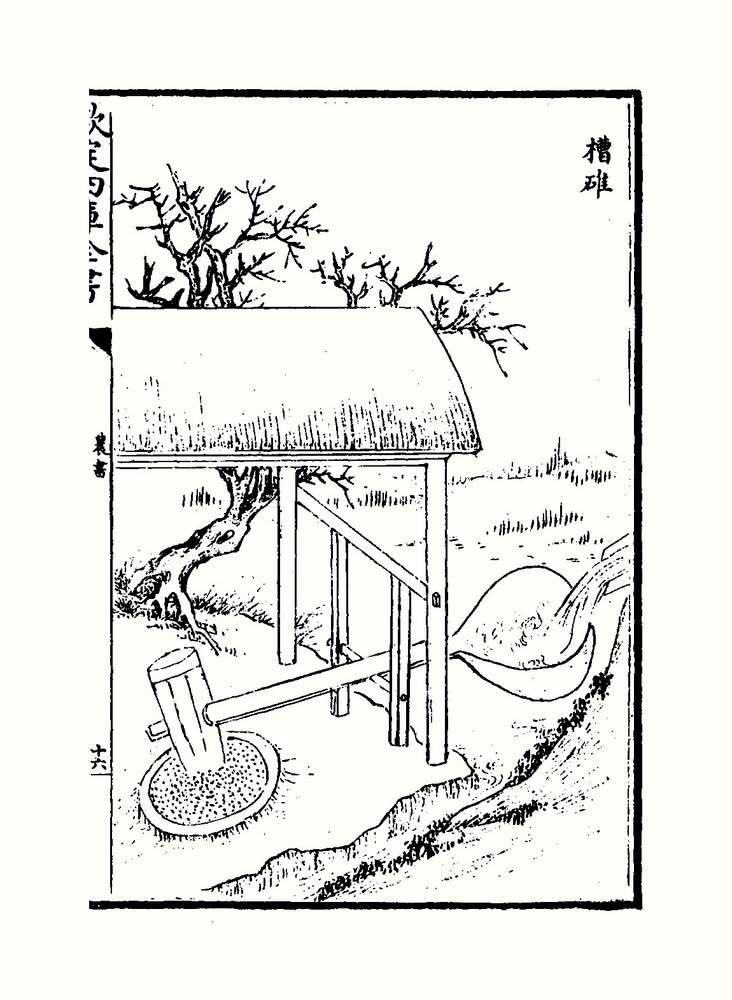

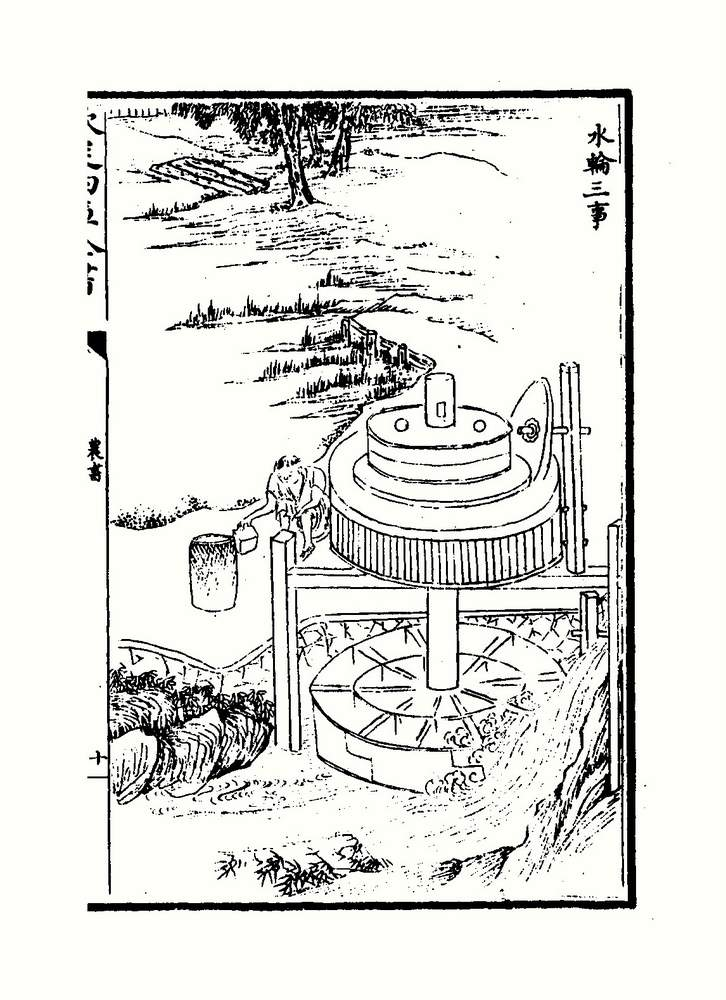

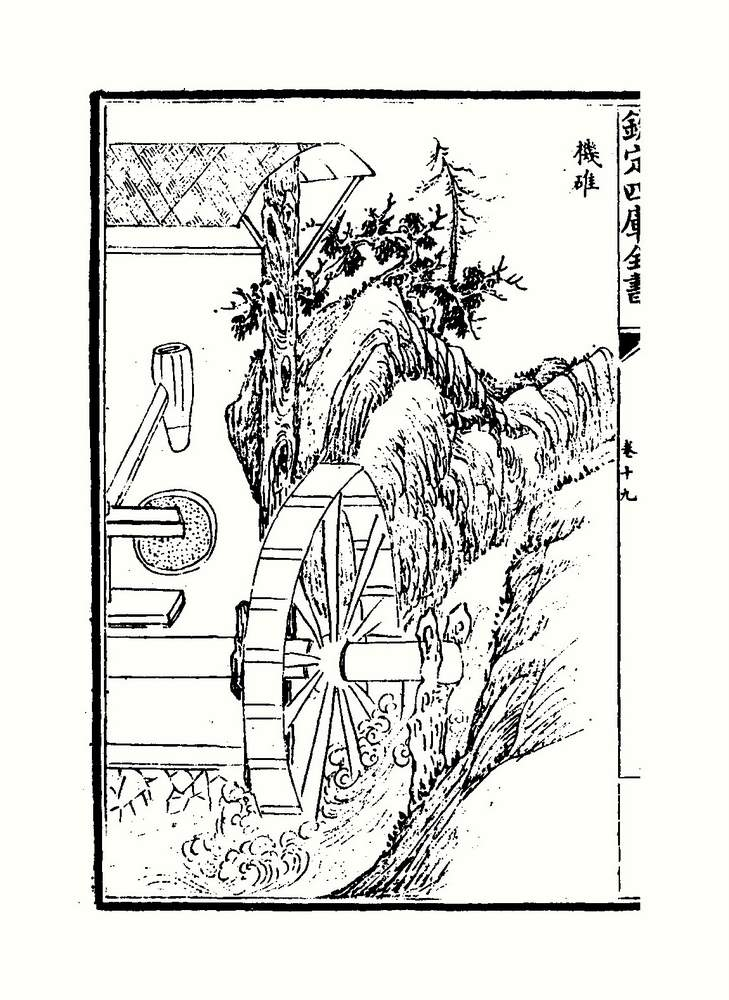

=== Wang's movable type printing ===
In improving movable type printing, Wang mentioned an alternative method of baking porcelain printing type with earthenware frame in order to make whole blocks. Wang is best known for his usage of wooden movable type while he was a magistrate of Jingde in Anhui province from 1290 to 1301. His main contribution was improving the speed of typesetting with simple mechanical devices, along with the complex, systematic arrangement of wooden movable types. Wang summarized the process of making wooden movable type as described in the passage below:

Now, however, there is another method [beyond earthenware type] that is both more exact and more convenient. A compositor's form is made of wood, strips of bamboo are used to mark the lines and a block is engraved with characters. The block is then cut into squares with a small fine saw till each character forms a separate piece. These separate characters are finished off with a knife on all four sides, and compared and tested till they are exactly the same height and size. Then the types are placed in the columns [of the form] and bamboo strips which have been prepared are pressed in between them. After the types have all been set in the form, the spaces are filled in with wooden plugs, so that the type is perfectly firm and will not move. When the type is absolutely firm, the ink is smeared on and printing begins.

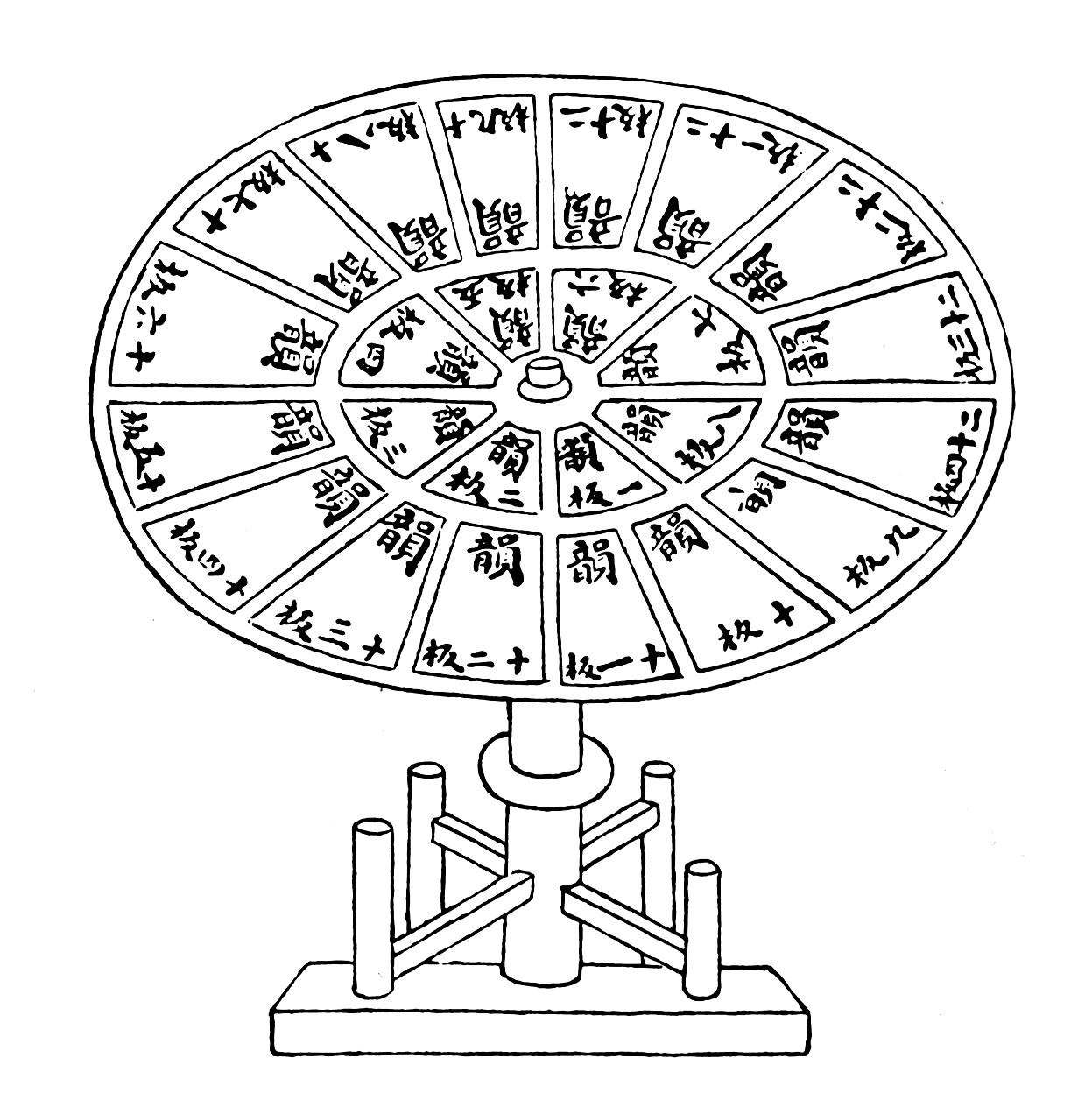
A revolving table typecase with individual movable type characters arranged primarily by rhyming scheme, from Wang Zhen's Nong Shu, published 1313.

Wooden movable type had been used and experimented with by Bi Sheng in the 11th century, but it was discarded because wood was judged to be an unsuitable material to use. Wang improved the earlier experimented process by adding the methods of specific type cutting and finishing, making the type case and revolving table that made the process more efficient. In Wang's system, all the Chinese writing characters were organized by five different tones and according to rhyming, using a standard official book of Chinese rhymes. Two revolving tables were actually used in the process; one table that had official types from the book of rhymes, and the other which contained the most frequently used Chinese writing characters for quick selection. To make the entire process more efficient, each Chinese character was assigned a different number, so that when a number was called, that writing character would be selected. Rare and unusual characters that were not prescribed a number were simply crafted on the spot by wood-cutters when needed.

While printing new books, Wang described that the rectangular dimensions of each book needed to be determined in order to make the corrected size of the four-sided wooden block used in printing. Providing the necessary ink job was done by brush that was moved vertically in columns, while the impression on paper the columns had to be rubbed with brush from top to bottom.

Two centuries before Hua Sui pioneered bronze-type printing in China in 1490, Wang had experimented with printing using tin, a metal favored for its low melting point while casting. In the Nong Shu, Wang wrote:

In more recent times [late 13th century], type has also been made of tin by casting. It is strung on an iron wire, and thus made fast in the columns of the form, in order to print books with it. But none of this type took ink readily, and it made untidy printing in most cases. For that reason they were not used long.

Thus, Chinese metal type of the 13th century using tin was unsuccessful because it was incompatible with the inking process. Although unsuccessful in Wang's time, the bronze metal type of Hua Sui in the late 15th century would be used for centuries in China, up until the late 19th century.

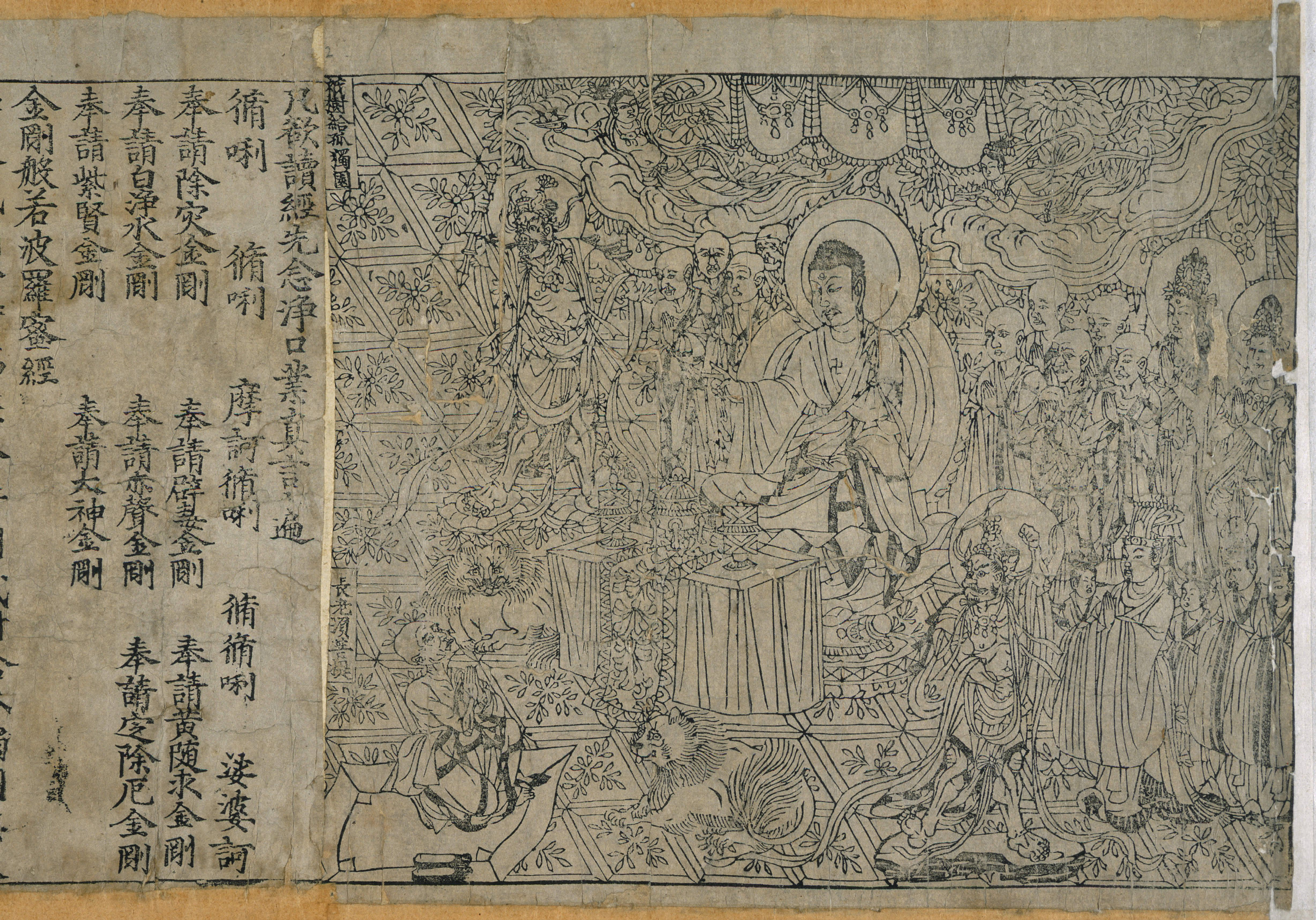
The Chinese Diamond Sutra (868), the oldest existent woodblock printed book in the world.

Although Wang's Nong Shu was mostly printed by use of woodblock printing, his innovation of wooden movable type soon became popularly used in the region of Anhui. Wang's wooden movable type was used to print the local gazetteer paper of Jingde City, which incorporated the use of 60,000 written characters organized on revolving tables. During the year of 1298, roughly one hundred copies of this were printed by wooden movable type in a month's time. Following in the footsteps of Wang, in 1322 the magistrate of Fenghua, Zhejiang province, named Ma Chengde, printed Confucian classics with movable type of 100,000 written characters on needed revolving tables. The process of metal movable type was also developed in Joseon Korea by the 13th century, while metal movable type was not pioneered in China until the Ming dynasty (1368–1644) printer Hua Sui used bronze movable type in 1490. Although metal movable type became available in China during the Ming period, wooden movable type persisted in common use even until the 19th century. After that point, the European printing press machine first pioneered by Johannes Gutenberg in the 15th century became the mainstay and standard in China and for the most part the global community until the advent of digital printing and the modern computer printer.

With movable type printing during the Ming dynasty of the 14th to 16th centuries, however, it was known to be used by local academies, local government offices, by wealthy local patrons of printing, and the large Chinese commercial printers located in the cities of Nanjing, Suzhou, Changzhou, Hangzhou, Wenzhou, and Fuzhou. There were many books from a wide variety of subjects published in wooden movable type during the Ming period, including novels, art, science and technology, family registers, and local gazettes. In 1541, two different significant publications using wooden movable type were made under the sponsorship of two different princes; the Prince of Shu printing the large literary collection of the earlier Song dynasty poet Su Che, and the Prince of Yi printing a book written as a rebuttal against superstitions written by a Yuan dynasty era author.

During the Qing dynasty (1644–1911), wooden movable type was used on a much wider scale than even the previous Ming period. It was officially sponsored by the imperial court at Beijing, yet was widespread amongst private printing companies. The creation of movable type writing fonts became a wise enterprise of investment, since they were commonly pawned, sold, or presented as gifts during the Qing period. In the sphere of the imperial court, the official Jin Jian (d. 1794) was placed in charge of printing at the Wuying Palace, where the Yongzheng Emperor had 253,000 wooden movable type characters crafted in the year of 1733. Jin Jian, the official in charge of this project, provided elaborate detail on the printing process in his Wu Ying Tian Ju Zhen Ban Cheng Shi (Imperial Printing Office Manual for Movable Type). In nineteen different sections, he provided detailed description for:

- type body
- cutting the type
- making type cases
- form trays
- strips in variable thickness
- blanks
- center columns
- sorting trays
- page and column rule forms
- setting the text
- proofing
- printing
- distribution of the type
- and a schedule for rotation

There are notable differences between Wang's movable type process and Jin Jian's. Wang carved the written characters on wooden blocks and then sawed them apart, while Jin initiated the process by preparing type bodies before the characters were individually cut into types. For setting type, Wang employed a method of revolving tables where the type came to the workers, whereas Jin developed a system where the workers went to the organized type. Wang's frame was also added after the type had already been set, whereas Jin printed the ruled sheets and text separately on the same paper.

=== Agriculture ===
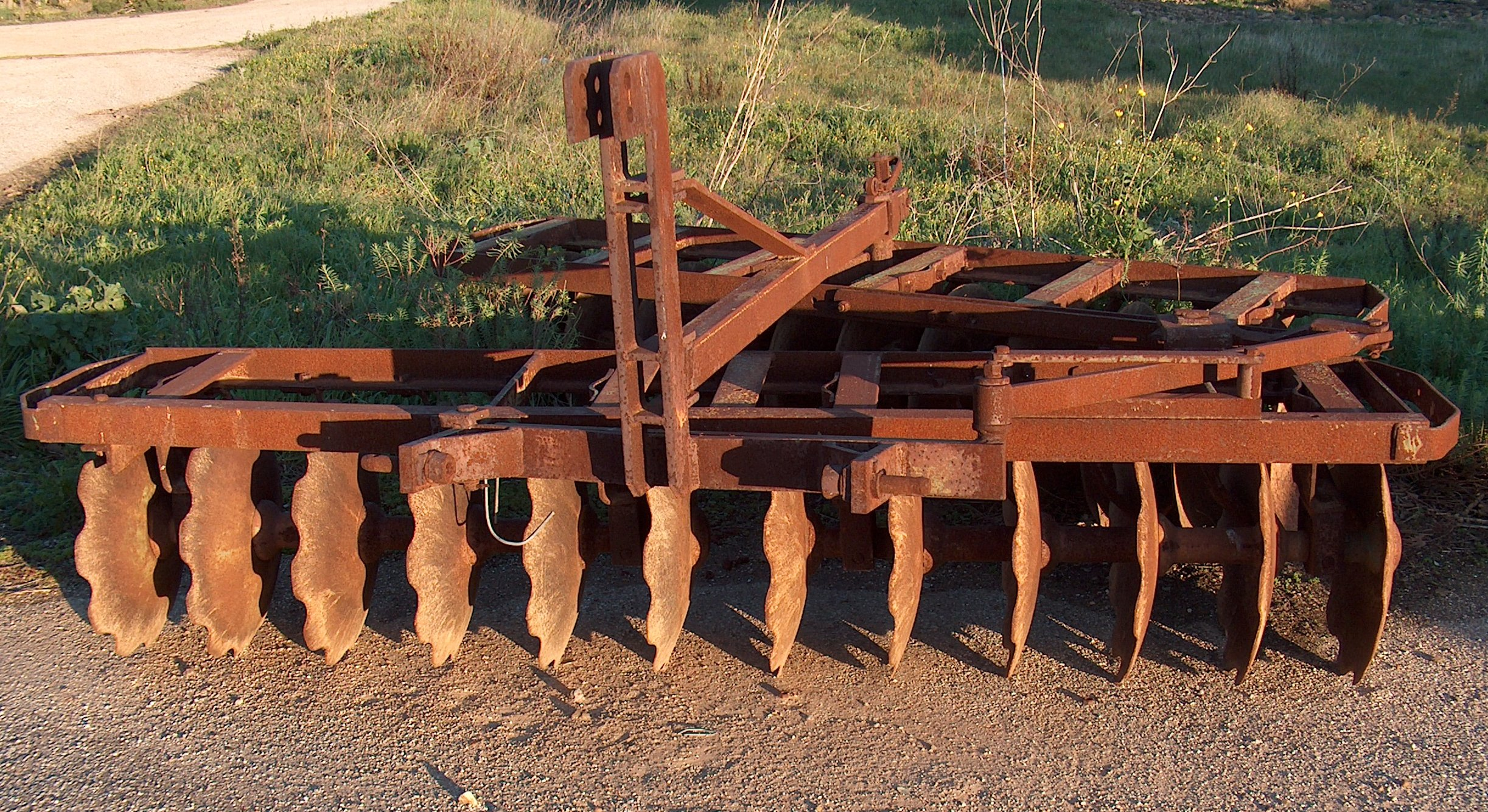
A modern disc harrow.

The main focus of the Nong Shu (Chinese: 王禎農書; pinyin: Wángzhēnnóng Shū) written by Wang was the realm of Chinese agriculture. His book listed and described an enormous catalogue of agricultural tools and implements used in the past and in his own day. Furthermore, Wang incorporated a systematic usage of illustrated pictures in his book to accompany every piece of farming equipment described. Wang also created an agricultural calendrical diagram in the form of a circle, which included the Heavenly Stems, the Earthly Branches, the four seasons, twelve months, twenty-four solar terms, seventy-two five-day periods, with each sequence of agricultural tasks and the natural phenomena which signal for their necessity, stellar configurations, phenology, and the sequence of agricultural production.

Amongst the various contemporary agricultural practices mentioned in the Nong Shu, Wang listed and described the use of ploughing, sowing, irrigation, cultivation of mulberries, etc. It listed and described many of the various foodstuffs and products of the many regions of China. The book outlined the use of not only agricultural tools, but food-processing, irrigation equipment, different types of fields, ceremonial vessels, various types of grain storage, carts, boats, mechanical devices, and textile machinery used in many applications. For example, one of the many devices described and illustrated in drawing is a large mechanical milling plant operated by the motive power of oxen, with an enormous rotating geared wheel engaging the toothed gears of eight different mills surrounding it. Of great interest to sinologist historians, Wang also outlined the difference between the agricultural technology of Northern China and that of Southern China. The main characteristic of agricultural technology of the north was technical applications fit for predominantly dryland cultivation, while intensified irrigation cultivation was more suitable for southern China. Furthermore, Wang used his treatise as a means to spread knowledge in support of certain agricultural practices or technologies found exclusively in either South or North that could benefit the other, if only they were more widely known, such as the southern hand-harrow used for weeding in the south, yet virtually unknown in the north.

==== Nong Shu chapters ====
Chapters 1–6

- Comprehensive prescriptions for agriculture and sericulture

Chapters 7–10

- Treatise on the Hundred Grains
  - Cereals (including legumes, hemp, and sesame)
  - Cucurbits and green vegetables
  - Fruits
  - Bamboos and miscellaneous (including ramie, cotton, tea, dye plants, etc.)

Chapters 11–22

- Illustrated Treatise on Agricultural Implements
  - Field systems
  - Agricultural tools
  - Wicker and basket ware
  - Food-processing equipment and grain storage
  - Ceremonial vessels, transport
  - Irrigation equipment, water-powered mills, etc.
  - Special implements for wheat
  - Sericulture and textile production

== See also ==
- History of typography in East Asia
- Woodblock printing
- Hua Sui
- History of western typography
- Printing Press
- Johannes Gutenberg
- Xu Guangqi
- History of Agriculture
- Agriculture in China
