= An Guo =

Chinese scholar, inventor, printer

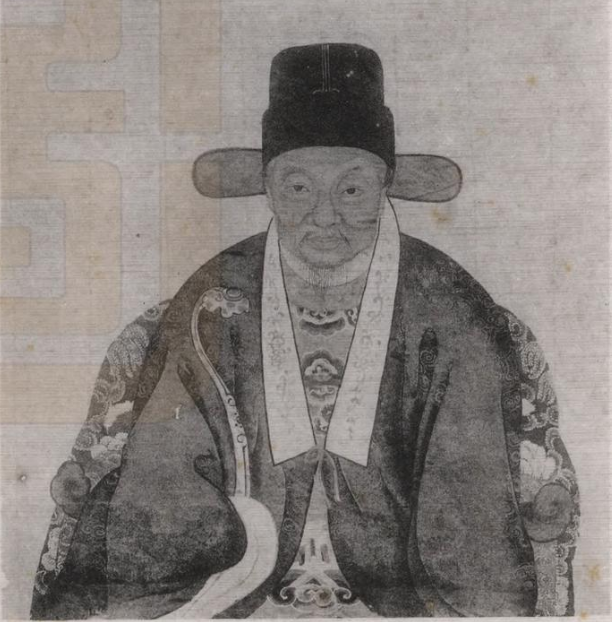
Portrait of An Guo

An Guo (simplified Chinese: 安国; traditional Chinese: 安國; pinyin: Ān Guó; 1481–1534 AD), was a Chinese scholar, inventor, printer, and antique collector from Wuxi, Jiangsu Province during the Ming Dynasty (1368-1644 AD). He was considered one of the wealthiest persons throughout the Ming Dynasty. An Guo is best known for improving the techniques of bronze movable type, and his broad collection of antiques and art pieces. Due to the large amount of money and land in his possession, he was nicknamed "Millionaire An" (安百万).

== Charity ==
After An Guo became extremely wealthy, he started helping the locals with preventing attacks and burglaries from Wokou (倭寇), by providing financial support to the military of the Ming dynasty, as well as sponsoring the construction of defensive walls. Also, he rebuilt and maintained a shrine by establishing a joint estate using some of his own land, and constructed a huge pleasure garden, which was later named Xi Lin (西林, West Garden), to provide work opportunities to those who were in poverty because of a severe famine.

== Personal life ==
An Guo was born in 1481 in Wuxi, Jiangsu Province, China, whose father was a landlord. When An Guo's father died, he succeeded to half of his father's land, which was approximately 50 acres. An Guo loved sweet olive so much, that he planted sweet olives for about 1 mile from his house. Therefore, his art name (hao in Mandarin, Chinese: 號) is "Guì Puō" (桂坡), which means "sweet olives on a hillslope" in Chinese. An Guo's printing house is named, "Gui Puo House" (桂坡馆). At the peak of his powers, An Guo was estimated to own 1 million acres of land located in today's Wuxi, Shanghai, Changzhou, etc.

== Family ==
An Guo had seven sons, An Rushan (安如山; 1503-1570), An Rupan (安如磐; 1507-1568), An Rushi (安如石; 1513–1564), An Ruyue (安如岳), An Rujing (安如京), An Rugang (安如岡), and An Ruling (安如陵). Though An Guo himself never achieved any rank or degree in the Chinese imperial examination (科舉), his eldest son An Rushan, grandson An Xifan (安希范; 1564-1621), and great grandson An Guangju (安广居; 1593-1644) all received jinshi (進士) degrees.

An Guo's grandson, An Xifan, who was the second son of An Rushan, was one of the main leaders of the Donglin Movement, and a co-founder of the Donglin Academy.
