= History of printing in East Asia =

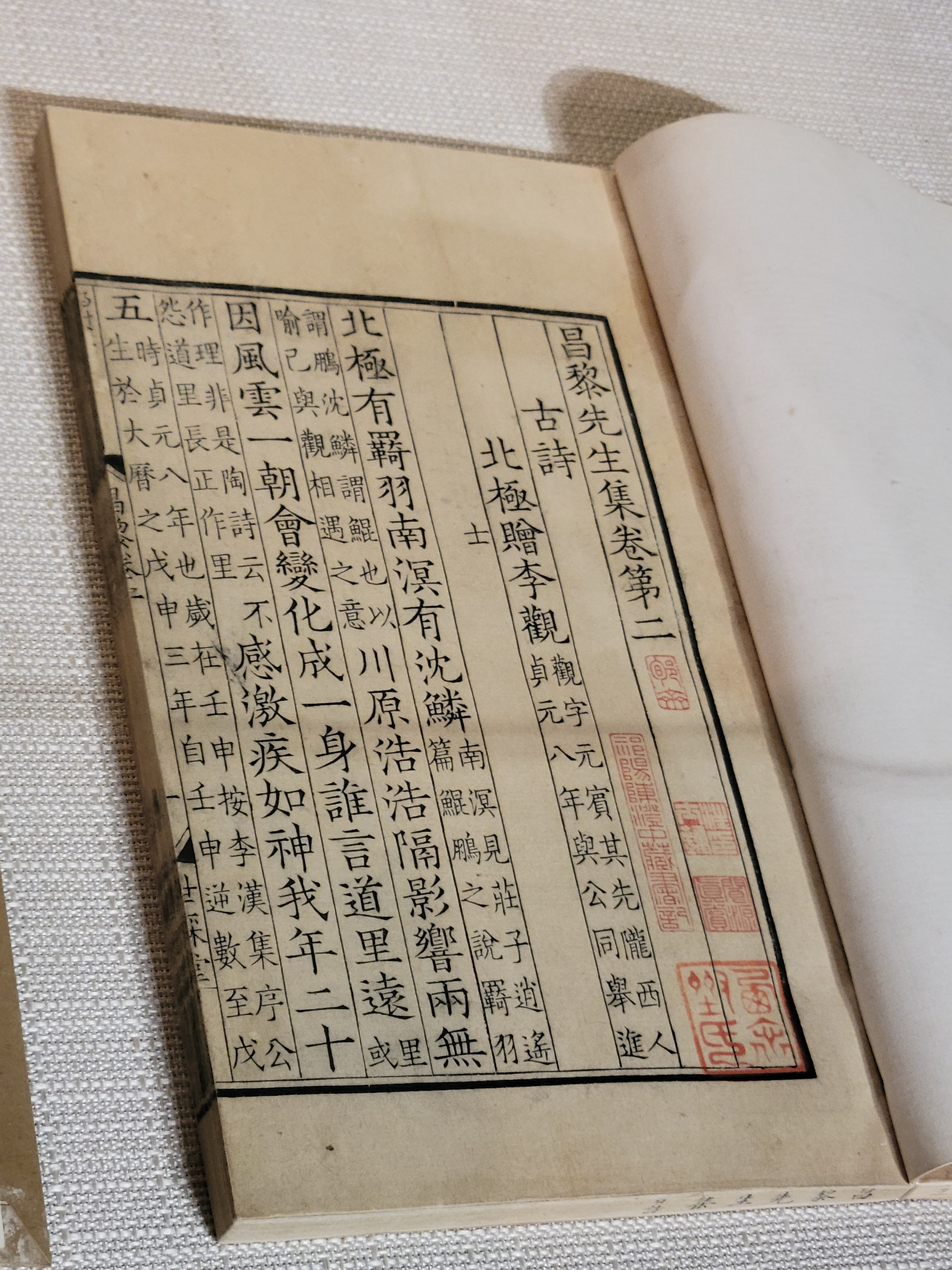
Literary collection of Han Yu, printed late 13th century by Liao Yingzhong

Printing in East Asia originated in China, evolving from ink rubbings made on paper or cloth from texts on stone tablets, used during the sixth century. (Note: An early method of reproduction that has been traced to the second century is the practice of using needles pushed through a stencil onto the target paper, fabric or plaster, to provide guidelines for subsequent artwork: this cannot reasonably be described as printing.) A type of printing called mechanical woodblock printing on paper started in China during the 7th century in the Tang dynasty. The practice of woodblock printing soon spread throughout East Asia. As recorded in 1088 by Shen Kuo in his Dream Pool Essays, the Chinese artisan Bi Sheng invented an early form of movable type using clay and wood pieces arranged and organized for written Chinese characters. The earliest printed paper money with movable metal type to print the identifying code of the money was made in 1161 during the Song dynasty. In 1193, a book documented instructions on how to use the copper movable type. The use of metal movable type spread to Korea by the 13th century during the Goryeo period, with the world's oldest surviving printed book using moveable metal type being from 1377 in Korea.

From the 17th century to the 19th century in Japan, woodblock prints called ukiyo-e were mass-produced, which influenced European Japonisme and the Impressionists. The printing press became known in East Asia by the 16th century but was not adopted. Centuries later, mechanical printing presses combining some European influences were adopted, but then was replaced with newer laser printing systems designed in the 20th and 21st centuries.

== Woodblock printing ==
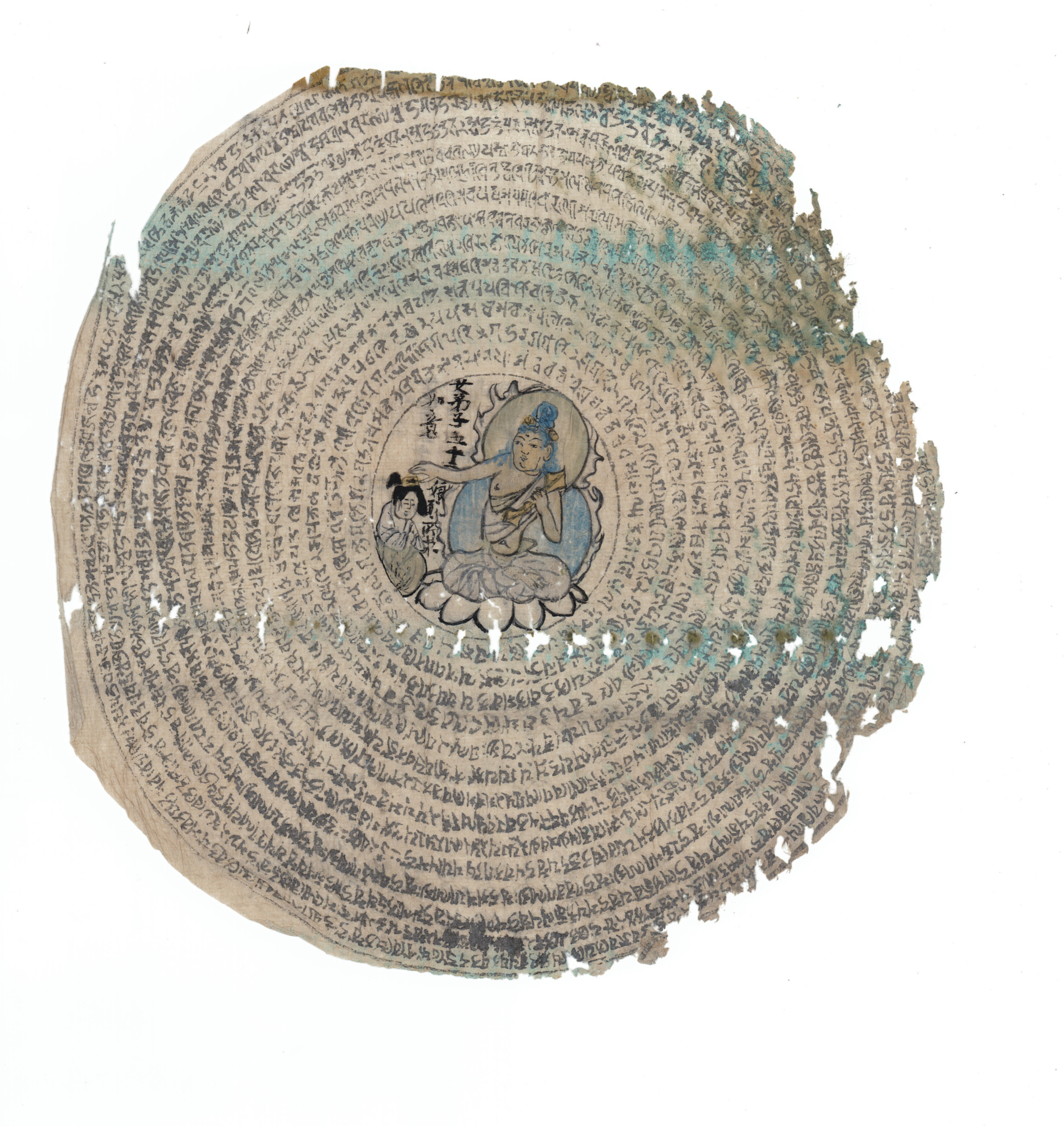
A fragment of a dharani print in Sanskrit and Chinese, c. 650–670, Tang dynasty

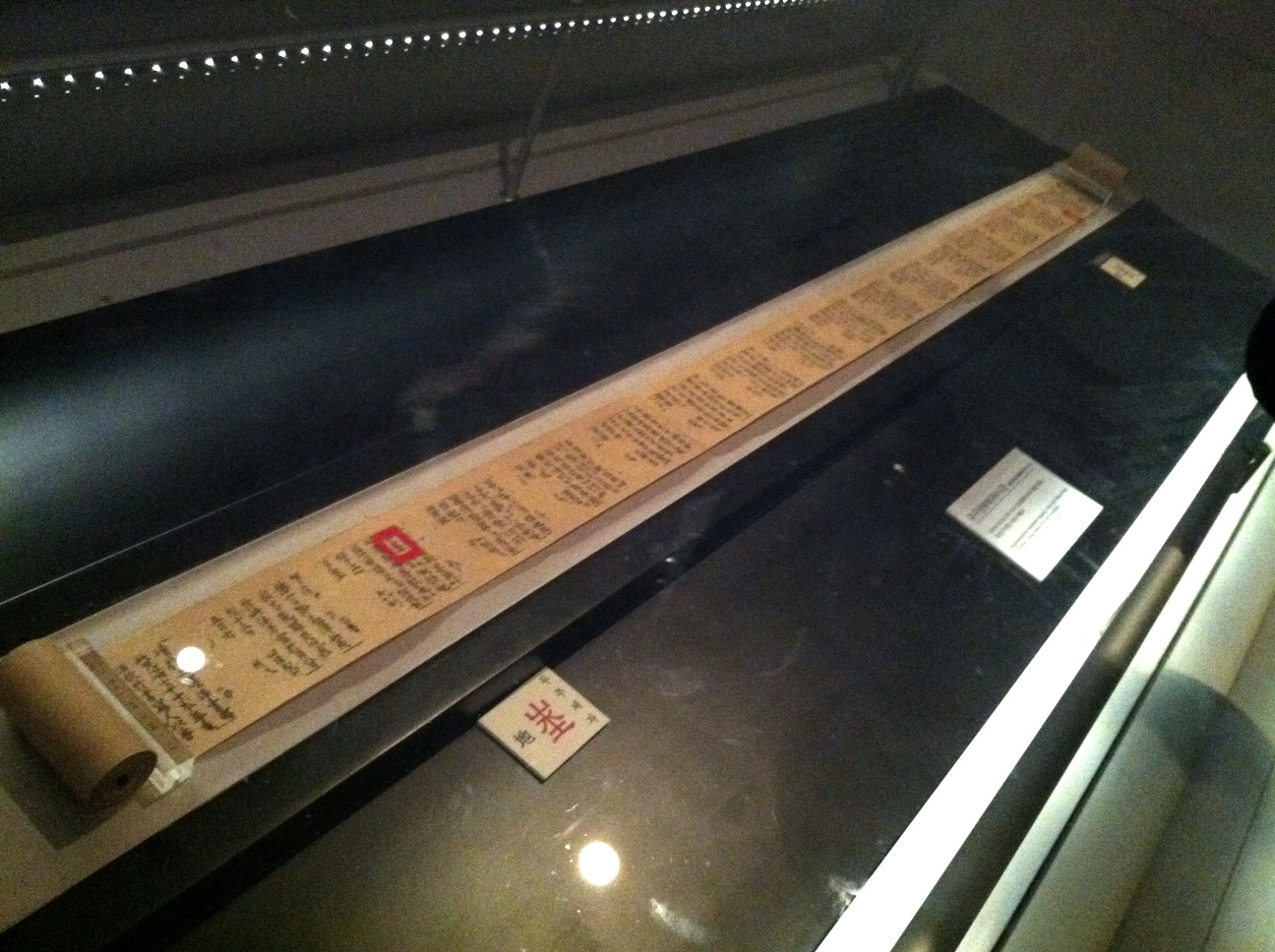
The Great Dharani Sutra, one of the world's oldest surviving woodblock prints, c. 704-751

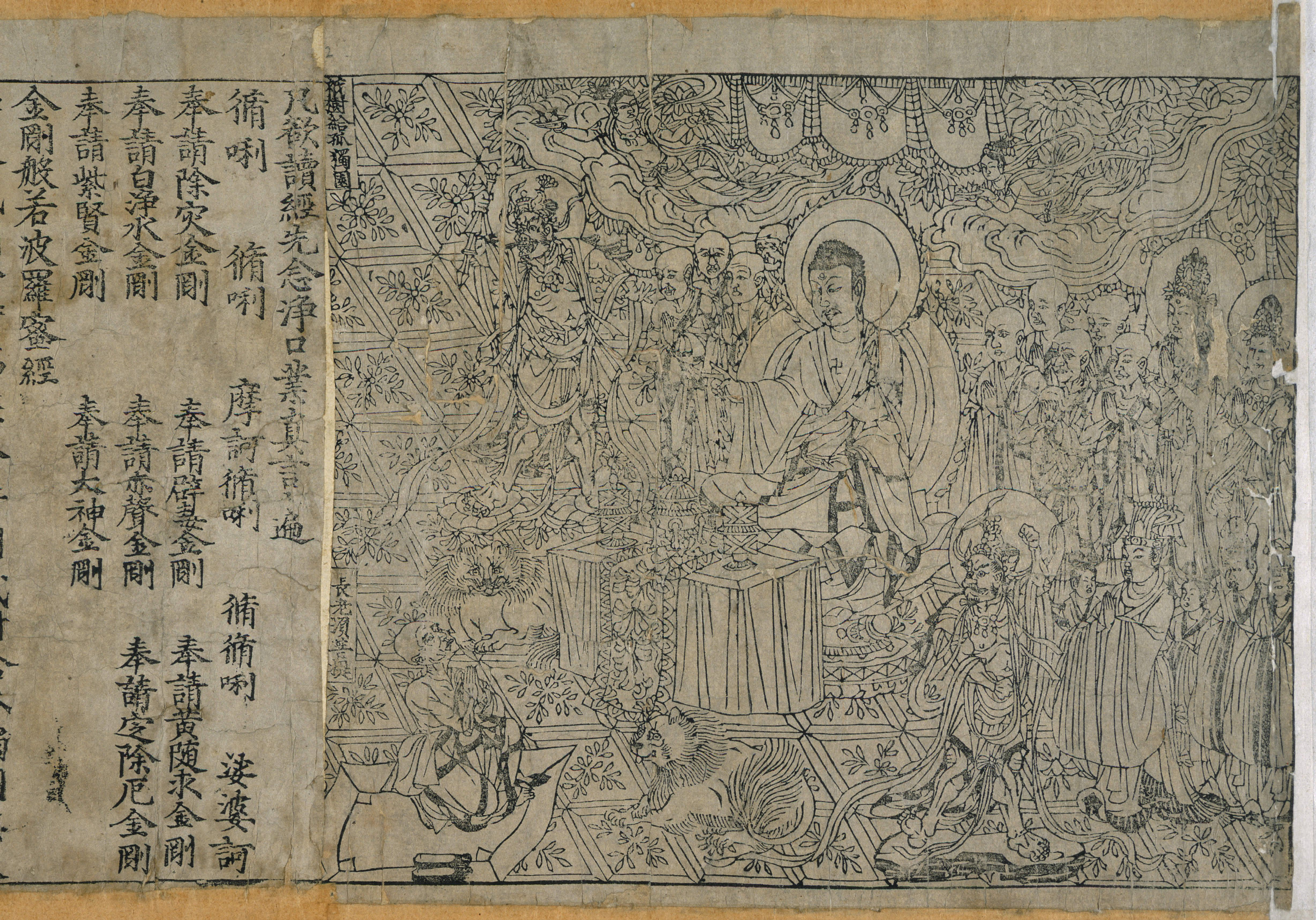
The intricate frontispiece of the Diamond Sutra from Tang-dynasty China, 868 CE (British Museum), the earliest extant printed text bearing a date of printing

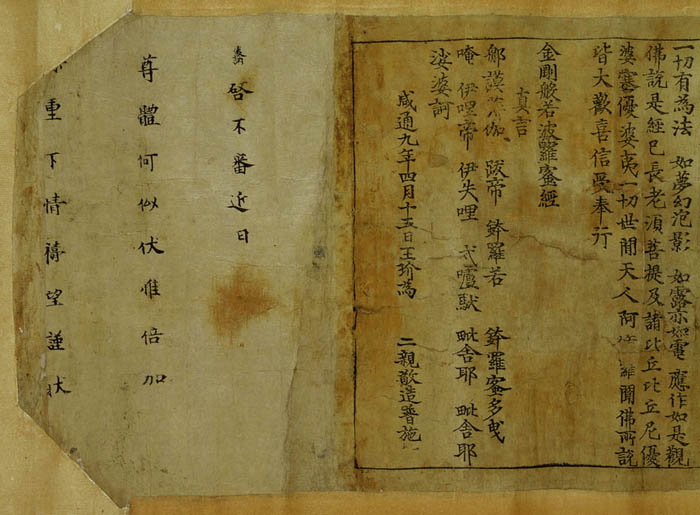
Colophon to the Diamond Sutra dating the year of printing to 868

Traditionally, there have been two main printing techniques in East Asia: woodblock printing (xylography) and moveable type printing. In the woodblock technique, ink is applied to letters carved upon a wooden board, which is then pressed onto paper. With moveable type, the board is assembled using different lettertypes, according to the page being printed. Wooden printing was used in the East from the 8th century onwards, and moveable metal type came into use during the 12th century.

=== China ===
Printing is considered one of the Four Great Inventions of China that spread throughout the world. In 2009, UNESCO recognized Chinese woodblock printing as an Intangible Cultural Heritage of Humanity.

According to the Book of the Southern Qi, in the 480s, a man named Gong Xuanyi (龔玄宜) styled himself "Gong the Sage" and said that "a supernatural being had given him a 'jade seal jade block writing,' which did not require a brush: one blew on the paper and characters formed." He then used his purported powers to mystify a local governor. Eventually he was dealt with by the governor's successor, who presumably executed Gong. Timothy Hugh Barrett postulates that Gong's magical jade block was actually a printing device, and Gong was one of the first printers, if not the first. The semi-mythical record of him therefore describes his usage of the printing process to deliberately bewilder onlookers and create an image of mysticism around himself.

Inscribed seals made of metal or stone, especially jade, and inscribed stone tablets probably provided inspiration for the invention of printing. Copies of classical texts on tablets were erected in a public place in Luoyang during the Han dynasty for scholars and students to copy. The Suishu jingjizhi, the bibliography of the official history of the Sui dynasty, includes several ink-squeeze rubbings, believed to have led to the early duplication of texts that inspired printing. A stone inscription cut in reverse dating from the first half of the 6th century implies that it may have been a large printing block.

The earliest specimen of woodblock printing on paper, whereby individual sheets of paper were pressed into wooden blocks with the text and illustrations carved into them, was discovered in 1974 in an excavation of Xi'an (then called Chang'an, the capital of Tang China), Shaanxi, China. It is a dharani sutra printed on hemp paper and dated to 650 to 670 CE, during the Tang dynasty (618–907). Another printed document dating to the early half of the Chinese Tang dynasty has also been found, the Saddharmapunṇḍarīka sutra or Lotus Sutra printed from 690 to 699. This coincides with the reign of Wu Zetian, during which the Longer Sukhāvatīvyūha Sūtra, which advocates the practice of printing apotropaic and merit-making texts and images, was translated by Chinese monks. From 658 to 663, Xuanzang printed one million copies of the image of Puxian Pusa to distribute to Buddhist devotees.

The oldest extant evidence of woodblock prints created for the purpose of reading are portions of the Lotus Sutra discovered at Turpan in 1906. They have been dated to the reign of Wu Zetian using character form recognition. The oldest text containing a specific date of printing was discovered in the Mogao Caves of Dunhuang in 1907 by Aurel Stein. This copy of the Diamond Sutra is 14 feet (4.3 metres) long and contains a colophon at the inner end, which reads: Reverently [caused to be] made for universal free distribution by Wang Jie on behalf of his two parents on the 13th of the 4th moon of the 9th year of Xiantong [i.e. 11 May, AD 868]. It is considered the world's oldest securely-dated woodblock scroll. The Diamond Sutra was closely followed by the earliest extant printed almanac, the Qianfu sinian lishu (乾符四年曆書), dated to 877. From 932 to 955 the Twelve Classics and an assortment of other texts were printed.

During the Song dynasty, the directorate of education and other agencies used these block prints to disseminate their standardized versions of the Classics. Other disseminated works include the Histories, philosophical works, encyclopedias, collections, and books on medicine and the art of war. In the state of Wuyue, Qian Chu published the dharani-sutra Baoqieyin tuoluonijing in 956, 965, and 975. Each purportedly in the form of 84,000 miniature scrolls. In 971 work began on the complete Tripiṭaka Buddhist Canon (Kaibao zangshu 開寶藏書) in Chengdu. It took 10 years to finish the 130,000 blocks needed to print the text. The finished product, the Sichuan edition of the Kaibao Canon, also known as the Kaibao Tripitaka, was printed in 983.

==== The printing process ====
The manuscript is transcribed onto thin slightly waxed sheets of paper by a professional calligrapher. The wax prevents the ink from being as readily absorbed into the paper, allowing more ink to be absorbed onto another surface. The paper is placed ink side down onto a wooden block on which a thin layer of rice paste has been thinly spread. The back of the paper is rubbed with a flat palm-fibre brush so that the wet rice paste absorbs some of the ink and an impression of the inked area is left on the block. The engraver uses a set of sharp-edged tools to cut away the uninked areas of the wood block in essence raising an inverse image of the original calligraphy above the background.

While carving, the knife is held like a dagger in the right hand and guided by the middle finger of the left hand, drawing towards the cutter. The vertical lines are cut first, then the block is rotated 90 degrees and the horizontal lines cut.

Four proof-readings are normally required – the transcript, the corrected transcript, the first sample print from the block and after any corrections have been made. A small correction to a block can be made by cutting a small notch and hammering in a wedge-shaped piece of wood. Larger errors require an inlay. After this, the block is washed to remove any refuse.

To print, the block is fixed firmly on a table. The printer takes a round horsehair inking brush and applies ink with a vertical motion. The paper is then laid on the block and rubbed with a long narrow pad to transfer the impression to the paper. The paper is peeled off and set to dry. Because of the rubbing process, printing is only done on one side of the paper, and the paper is thinner than in the west, but two pages are normally printed at once.

Sample copies were sometimes made in red or blue, but black ink was always used for production. It is said that a skilled printer could produce as many as 1500 or 2000 double sheets in a day. Blocks can be stored and reused when extra copies are needed. 15,000 prints can be taken from a block with a further 10,000 after touching up.

=== Spread across East Asia ===
==== Japan ====
In 764 the Empress Kōken commissioned one million small wooden pagodas, each containing a small woodblock scroll printed with a Buddhist text (Hyakumantō Darani). These were distributed to temples around the country as thanks for the suppression of the Emi Rebellion of 764. These are the earliest examples of woodblock printing known, or documented, from Japan.

In the Kamakura period from the 12th century to the 13th century, many books were printed and published by woodblock printing at Buddhist temples in Kyoto and Kamakura.

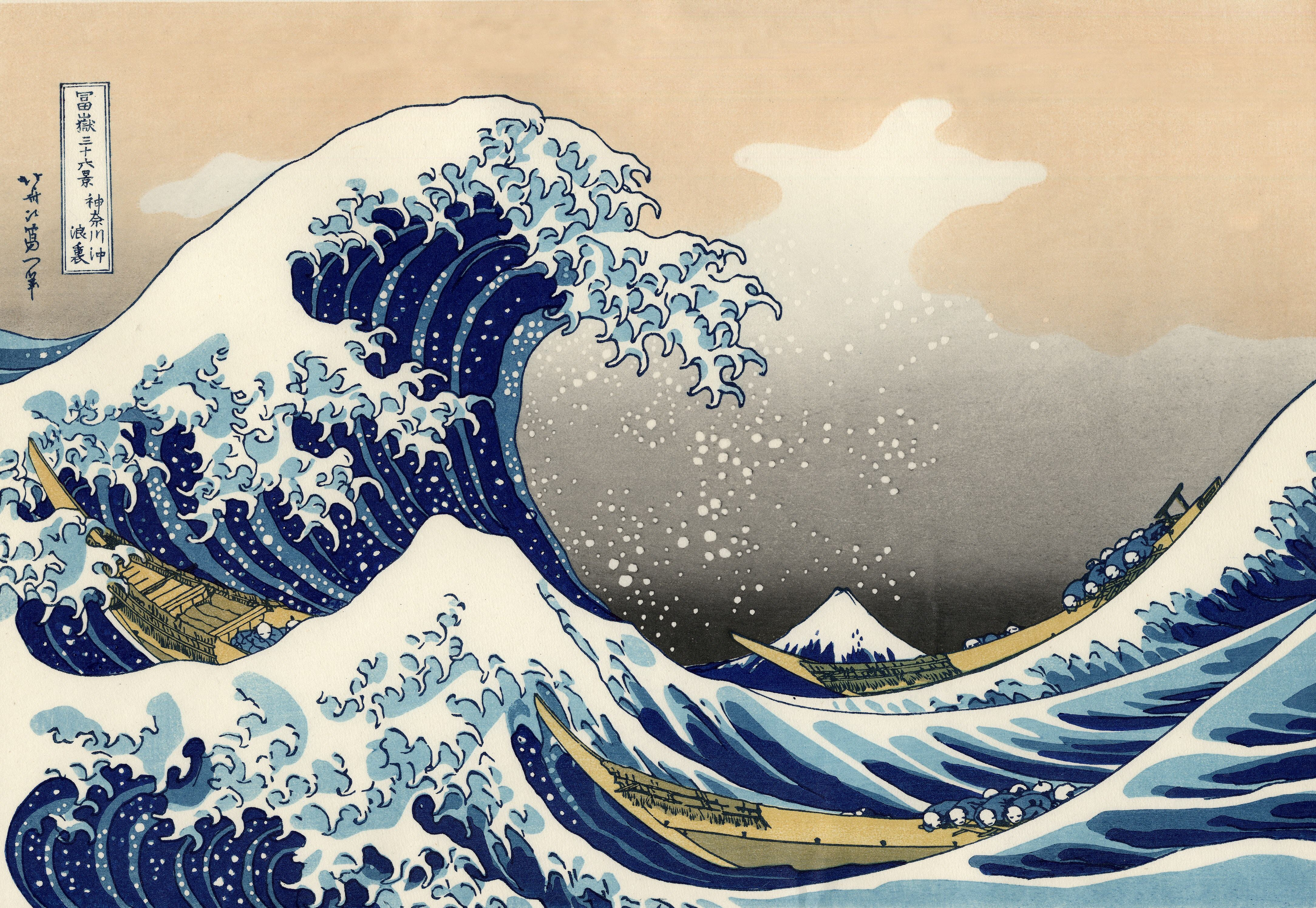
Under the Wave off Kanagawa by Hokusai, a ukiyo-e artist

The moveable-type printing press was introduced to Japan by Jesuit missionaries in 1590 and sparked interest in printing Japanese works and books. In Japan, from the Edo period in the 1600s, books and illustrations were mass-produced by woodblock printing and spread among the common people. This was due to economic development and a very high literacy rate for the time. The literacy rate of the Japanese in the Edo period was almost 100% for the samurai class and 50% to 60% for the chōnin and nōmin (farmer) class due to the spread of private schools terakoya. There were more than 600 rental bookstores in Edo, and people lent woodblock-printed illustrated books of various genres. The content of these books varied widely, including travel guides, gardening books, cookbooks, kibyōshi (satirical novels), sharebon (books on urban culture), kokkeibon (comical books), ninjōbon (romance novel), yomihon, kusazōshi, art books, play scripts for the kabuki and jōruri (puppet) theatre, etc. The best-selling books of this period were Kōshoku Ichidai Otoko (Life of an Amorous Man) by Ihara Saikaku, Nansō Satomi Hakkenden by Takizawa Bakin, and Tōkaidōchū Hizakurige by Jippensha Ikku, and these books were reprinted many times.

From the 17th century to the 19th century, ukiyo-e depicting secular subjects became very popular among the common people and were mass-produced. ukiyo-e is based on kabuki actors, sumo wrestlers, beautiful women, landscapes of sightseeing spots, historical tales, and so on, and Hokusai and Hiroshige are the most famous artists. In the 18th century, Suzuki Harunobu established the technique of multicolor woodblock printing called nishiki-e and greatly developed Japanese woodblock printing culture such as ukiyo-e. Ukiyo-e influenced European Japonism and Impressionism. In the early 20th century, shin-hanga that fused the tradition of ukiyo-e with the techniques of Western paintings became popular, and the works of Hasui Kawase and Hiroshi Yoshida gained international popularity.

==== Korea ====
In Korea, an example of woodblock printing from the eighth century was discovered in 1966. A copy of the Buddhist Dharani Sutra called the Pure Light Dharani Sutra (Korean: 무구정광대다라니경; Hanja: 無垢淨光大陀羅尼經; RR: Mugu jeonggwang dae darani-gyeong), discovered in Gyeongju, South Korea in a Silla dynasty pagoda that was repaired in 751 CE, was undated but must have been created sometime before the reconstruction of the Shakyamuni Pagoda (Korean: 석가탑; Hanja: 釋迦塔) of Bulguk Temple, Gyeongju Province in 751 CE. The document is estimated to have been created no later than 704 AD. This Great Dharani Sutra was found inside the pagoda while dismantling the tower to repair it. Many sari (religious relics) were found with the prints. It was once considered the oldest extant woodblock print, however archaeological discoveries since 1966 have pushed the earliest printed texts earlier in China. One row of the dharani gyeongmun (dharani scriptures) 8–9 is printed in the form of a roll.

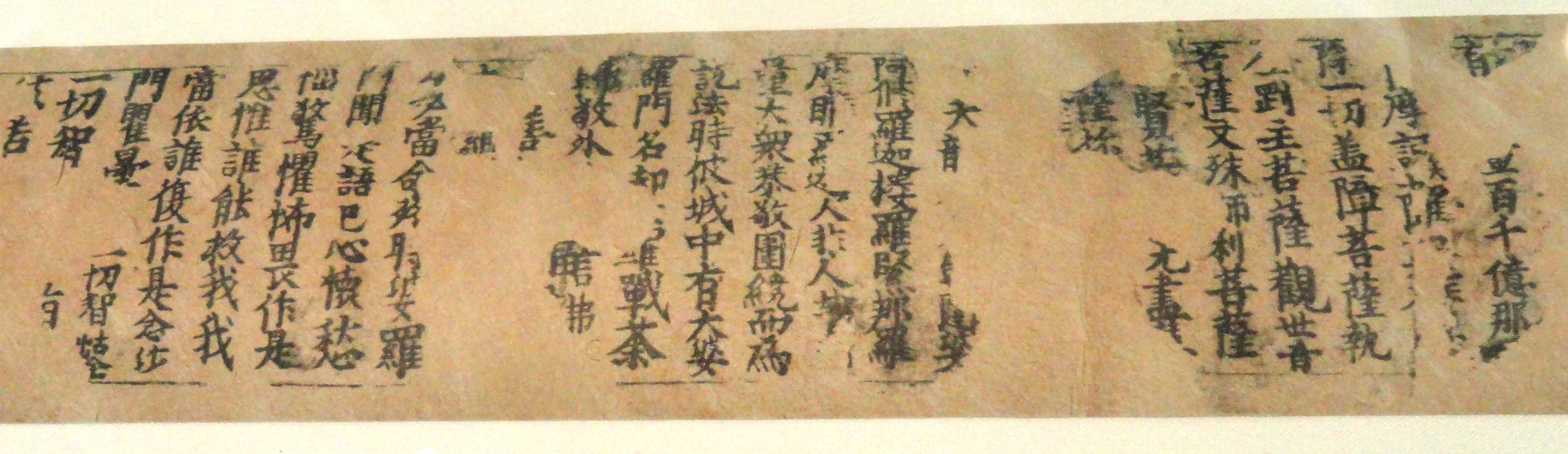
The Great Dharani Sutra is considered one of the oldest printed copies in the world.

In 989 Seongjong of Goryeo sent the monk Yeoga to request from the Song a copy of the complete Buddhist canon. The request was granted in 991 when Seongjong's official Han Eongong visited the Song court. In 1007, Korean printed a 956 edition of the dharani sutra Baoqieyin tuoluonijing. In 1011, Hyeonjong of Goryeo issued the carving of their own set of the Buddhist canon, which would come to be known as the Goryeo Daejanggyeong. The project was suspended in 1031 after Heyongjong's death, but work resumed in 1046 after Munjong's accession to the throne. The completed work, amounting to some 6,000 volumes, was finished in 1087. Unfortunately the original set of woodblocks was destroyed in a conflagration during the Mongol invasion of 1232. King Gojong ordered another set to be created and work began in 1237, this time only taking 12 years to complete. In 1248 the complete Goryeo Daejanggyeong numbered 81,258 printing blocks of magnolia wood carved on both sides, 52,330,152 characters, 1496 titles, and 6568 volumes. Due to the stringent editing process that went into the Goryeo Daejanggyeong and its surprisingly enduring nature, having survived completely intact over 760 years, it is considered the most accurate Buddhist canon written in Classical Chinese as well as a standard edition for East Asian Buddhist scholarship. It is currently kept in the Haeinsa. A printing office was established in the National Academy in 1101 and the Goryeo government collection numbered several tens of thousands.

== Movable type ==
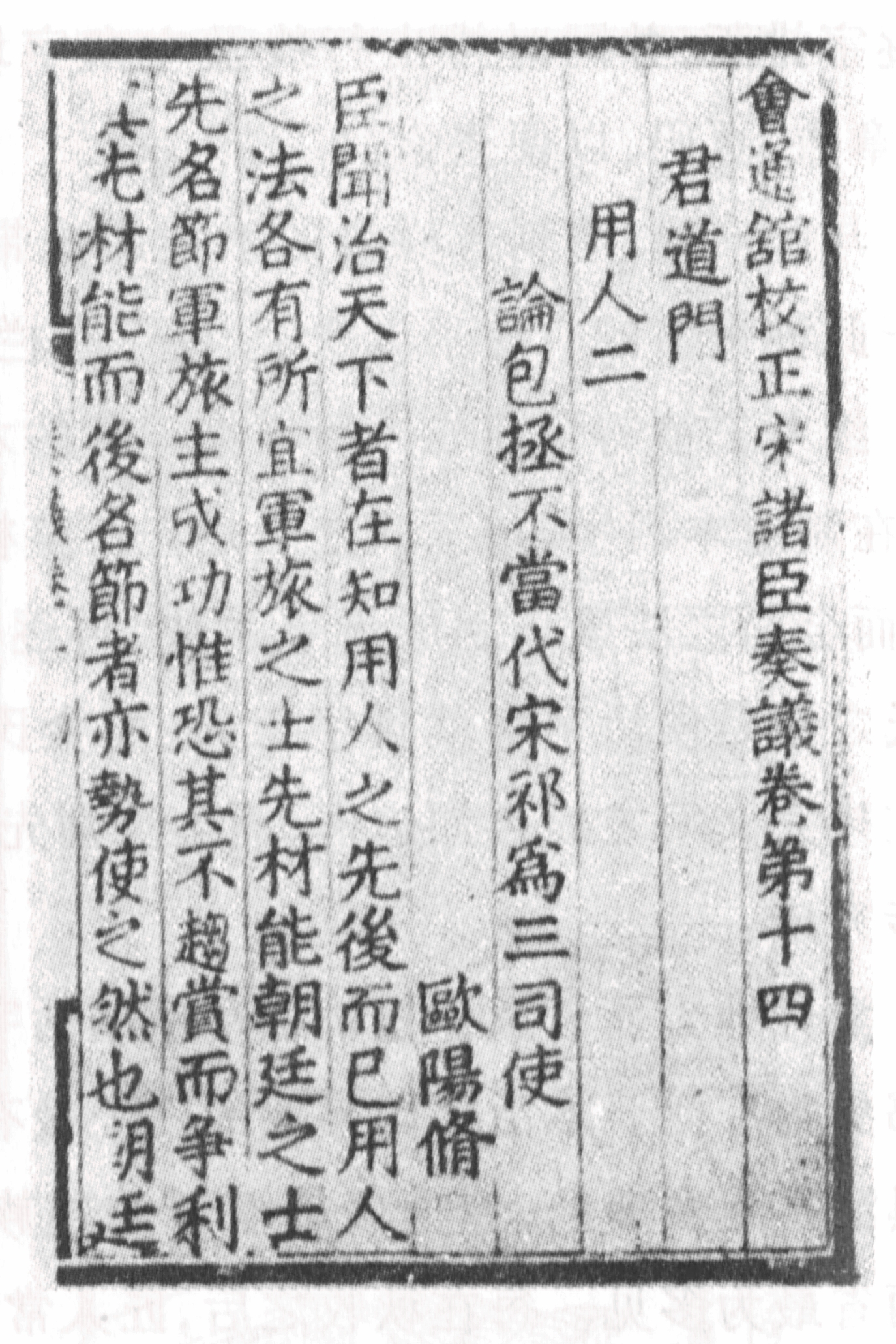
A page from bronze movable-type book by Hua Sui, printed in 1490 (Ming Dynasty)

=== Ceramic movable type in China ===
Bi Sheng (990–1051) developed the first known movable-type system for printing in China around 1040 AD during the Northern Song dynasty, using ceramic materials. As described by the Chinese scholar Shen Kuo (1031–1095):

When he wished to print, he took an iron frame and set it on the iron plate. In this he placed the types, set close together. When the frame was full, the whole made one solid block of type. He then placed it near the fire to warm it. When the paste [at the back] was slightly melted, he took a smooth board and pressed it over the surface, so that the block of type became as even as a whetstone.

For each character there were several types, and for certain common characters there were twenty or more types each, in order to be prepared for the repetition of characters on the same page. When the characters were not in use he had them arranged with paper labels, one label for each rhyme-group, and kept them in wooden cases.

If one were to print only two or three copies, this method would be neither simple nor easy. But for printing hundreds or thousands of copies, it was marvelously quick. As a rule he kept two forms going. While the impression was being made from the one form, the type was being put in place on the other. When the printing of the one form was finished, the other was then ready. In this way the two forms alternated and the printing was done with great rapidity.

In 1193, Zhou Bida, an officer of Southern Song Dynasty, made a set of the clay movable-type method according to the method described by Shen Kuo in his Dream Pool Essays, and printed his book Notes of The Jade Hall (玉堂雜記).

Clay type printing was practised in China from the Song, through to the Qing dynasty (1644–1912). As late as 1844, there were still books printed in China with ceramic movable types. (However, ceramic type was not used during the Ming dynasty, and it was not until the middle of the Qing dynasty that its usage revived). Ceramic type not holding Chinese ink well and distortion of the type sometimes occurring during the baking process contributed in preventing it from being popular.

=== Metal movable type in China ===
Bronze movable type was invented in China no later than the 12th century, according to at least 13 material finds in China, in large scale bronze plate printing of paper money and formal official documents issued by Jin (1115–1234) and Southern Song (1127–1279) dynasties with embedded bronze metal types for anti counterfeit markers. Such paper money printing might date back to the 11th-century jiaozi of Northern Song (960–1127). However, problems existed in using metal type in printing text, and it was not until the late 15th century that metal movable type was widely used in China.

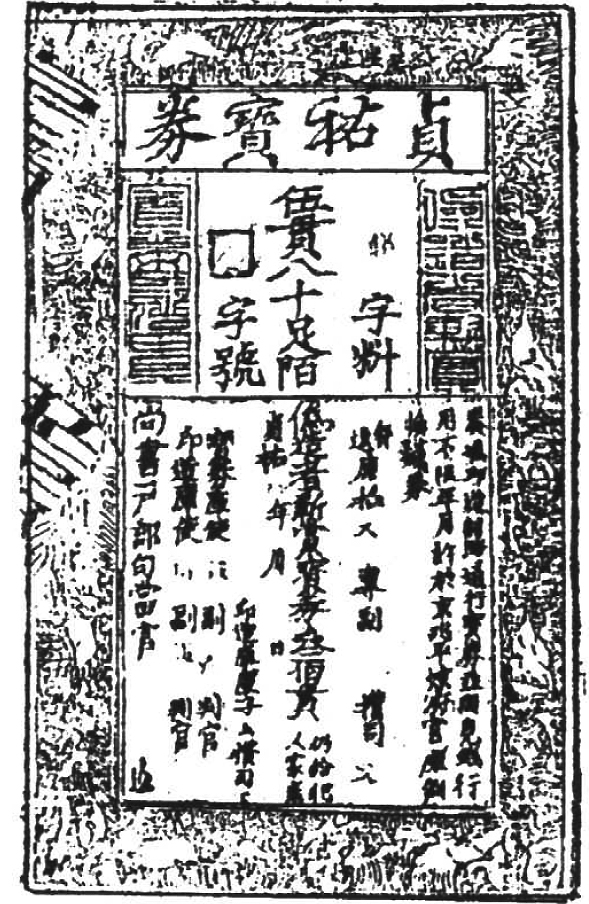
Copperplate of 1215–1216 5000-cash Jin dynasty (1115–1234) paper money with bronze movable type counterfeit markers

The typical example of this kind of bronze movable type embedded copper-block printing is a printed "check" of Jin Dynasty with two square holes for embedding two bronze movable type characters, each selected from 1000 different characters, such that each printed paper money has a different combination of markers. A copper block printed paper money dated between 1215 and 1216 in the collection of Luo Zhenyu's Pictorial Paper Money of the Four Dynasties, 1914, shows two special characters one called Ziliao, the other called Zihao for the purpose of preventing counterfeit; over the Ziliao there is a small character (輶) printed with movable copper type, while over the Zihao there is an empty square hole, apparently the associated copper metal type was lost. Another sample of Song dynasty money of the same period in the collection of Shanghai Museum has two empty square holes above Ziliao as well as Zihou, due to the loss of two copper movable types. Song dynasty bronze block embedded with bronze metal movable type printed paper money was issued in large scale and in circulation for a long time.

In the 1298 book Zao Huozi Yinshufa (造活字印書法) by the early Yuan dynasty (1271–1368) official Wang Zhen, there is mention of tin movable type, used probably since the Southern Song dynasty (1127–1279), but this was largely experimental. It was unsatisfactory due to its incompatibility with the inking process.

During the Mongol Empire (1206–1405), printing using movable type spread from China to Central Asia. The Uyghurs of Central Asia used movable type, their script type adopted from the Mongol language, some with Chinese words printed between the pages, a strong evidence that the books were printed in China.

During the Ming dynasty (1368–1644), Hua Sui in 1490 used bronze type in printing books. In 1574 the massive 1000 volume encyclopedia Imperial Readings of the Taiping Era were printed with bronze movable type.

In 1725, the Qing dynasty government made 250,000 pieces of bronze type and printed 64 sets of the encyclopedic Complete Classics Collection of Ancient China. Each set consisted of 5040 volumes, making a total of 322,560 volumes printed using movable type.

=== Wooden movable type in China ===
Wooden movable type was also first developed around 1040 AD by Bi Sheng (990–1051), as described by the Chinese scholar Shen Kuo (1031–1095), but was abandoned in favour of clay movable types due to the presence of wood grains and the unevenness of the wooden type after being soaked in ink.

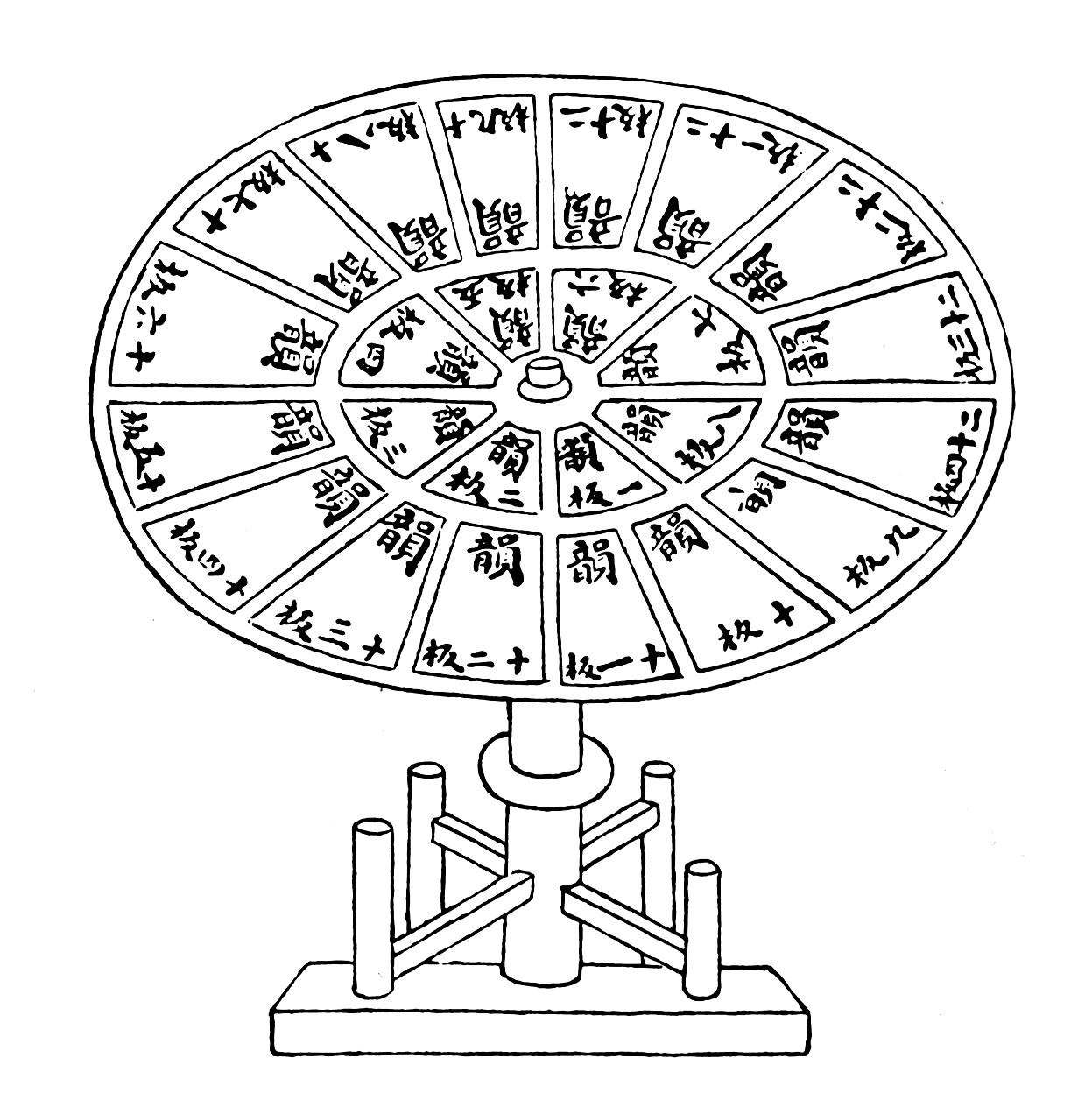
A revolving typecase for wooden type in China, from Wang Zhen's book published in 1313

In 1298, Wang Zhen (王禎), a Yuan dynasty governmental official of Jingde County, Anhui Province, China, re-invented a method of making movable wooden types. He made more than 30,000 wooden movable types and printed 100 copies of Records of Jingde County (《旌德縣誌》), a book of more than 60,000 Chinese characters. Soon afterwards, he summarized his invention in his book A method of making moveable wooden types for printing books. This system was later enhanced by pressing wooden blocks into sand and casting metal types from the depression in copper, bronze, iron or tin. This new method overcame many of the shortcomings of woodblock printing. Rather than manually carving an individual block to print a single page, movable type printing allowed for the quick assembly of a page of text. Furthermore, these new, more compact type fonts could be reused and stored. The set of wafer-like metal stamp types could be assembled to form pages, inked, and page impressions taken from rubbings on cloth or paper. In 1322, a Fenghua county officer Ma Chengde (馬稱德) in Zhejiang, made 100,000 wooden movable types and printed 43 volume Daxue Yanyi (《大學衍義》). Wooden movable types were used continually in China. Even as late as 1733, a 2300-volume Wuying Palace Collected Gems Edition (《武英殿聚珍版叢書》) was printed with 253,500 wooden movable type on order of the Yongzheng Emperor, and completed in one year.

A number of books printed in Tangut script during the Western Xia (1038–1227) period are known, of which the Auspicious Tantra of All-Reaching Union that was discovered in the ruins of Baisigou Square Pagoda in 1991 is believed to have been printed sometime during the reign of Emperor Renzong of Western Xia (1139–1193). It is considered by many Chinese experts to be the earliest extant example of a book printed using wooden movable type.

A particular difficulty posed the logistical problems of handling the several thousand logographs whose command is required for full literacy in the Chinese language. It was faster to carve one woodblock per page than to composite a page from so many different types. However, if one was to use movable type for multitudes of the same document, the speed of printing would be relatively quicker.

Although the wooden type was more durable under the mechanical rigors of handling, repeated printing wore the character faces down, and the types could only be replaced by carving new pieces. In addition, wooden type could apparently absorb moisture and the print form would be uneven when set up, and the wooden type could be more difficult to remove from the paste used in the form.

=== Metal movable type in Korea ===
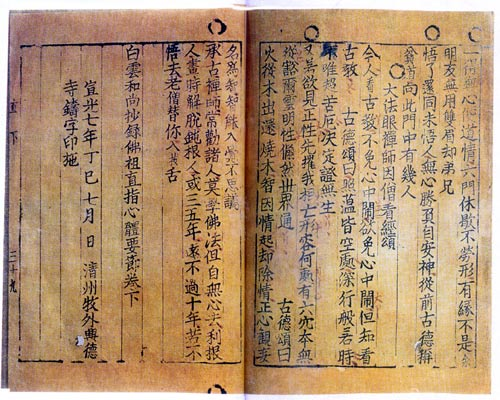
Jikji, "Selected Teachings of Buddhist Sages and Son Masters", the earliest known book printed with movable metal type, printed in Korea in 1377. Bibliothèque Nationale de France.

The transition from wood type to movable metal type occurred in Korea during the Goryeo dynasty, some time in the 13th century, to meet the heavy demand for both religious and secular books. A set of ritual books, Sangjeong Gogeum Yemun were printed with movable metal type in 1234. The credit for the first metal movable type may go to Ch'oe Yun-ŭi of the Goryeo Dynasty in 1234.

The techniques for bronze casting, used at the time for making coins (as well as bells and statues) were adapted to making metal type. Unlike the metal punch system thought to be used by Gutenberg, the Koreans used a sand-casting method. The following description of the Korean font casting process was recorded by the Joseon dynasty scholar Song Hyon during the 15th century:

At first, one cuts letters in beech wood. One fills a trough level with fine sandy [clay] of the reed-growing seashore. Wood-cut letters are pressed into the sand, then the impressions become negative and form letters [molds]. At this step, placing one trough together with another, one pours the molten bronze down into an opening. The fluid flows in, filling these negative molds, one by one becoming type. Lastly, one scrapes and files off the irregularities, and piles them up to be arranged.

While metal movable type printing was developed in Korea and the oldest extant metal print book had been printed in Korea, Korea never witnessed a printing revolution comparable to Europe's:

Korean printing with movable metallic type developed mainly within the royal foundry of the Yi dynasty. Royalty kept a monopoly of this new technique and by royal mandate suppressed all non-official printing activities and any budding attempts at commercialization of printing. Thus, printing in early Korea served only the small, noble groups of the highly stratified society.

Nevertheless, the Korean peninsula saw the development of metal movable type, including the commissioning of 100,000 pieces of movable type and two complete fonts, by King Taejong of Joseon in 1403.

A potential solution to the linguistic and cultural bottleneck that held back movable type in Korea for two hundred years appeared in the early 15th century—a generation before Gutenberg would begin working on his own movable type invention in Europe—when Koreans devised a simplified alphabet of 24 characters called Hangul, which required fewer characters to typecast.

=== Movable type in Japan ===
In 1590, the Tenshō embassy brought the first printing press to Japan after returning from the West. It was first used in Kazusa, Nagasaki in 1591. However, printing presses were discontinued after the ban on Christianity in 1614. Moveable type seized from Korea by Toyotomi Hideyoshi's forces in 1593 was in use at the same time as the printing press from Europe. An edition of the Confucian Analects was printed in 1598, using the Korean moveable type, at the order of Emperor Go-Yōzei.

Tokugawa Ieyasu established a printing school at Enko-ji in Kyoto and started publishing books using domestic wooden movable type printing-press instead of metal from 1599. Ieyasu supervised the production of 100,000 types, which were used to print many political and historical books. In 1605, books using the domestic copper movable-type printing press began to be published, but copper type did not become mainstream after Ieyasu died in 1616.

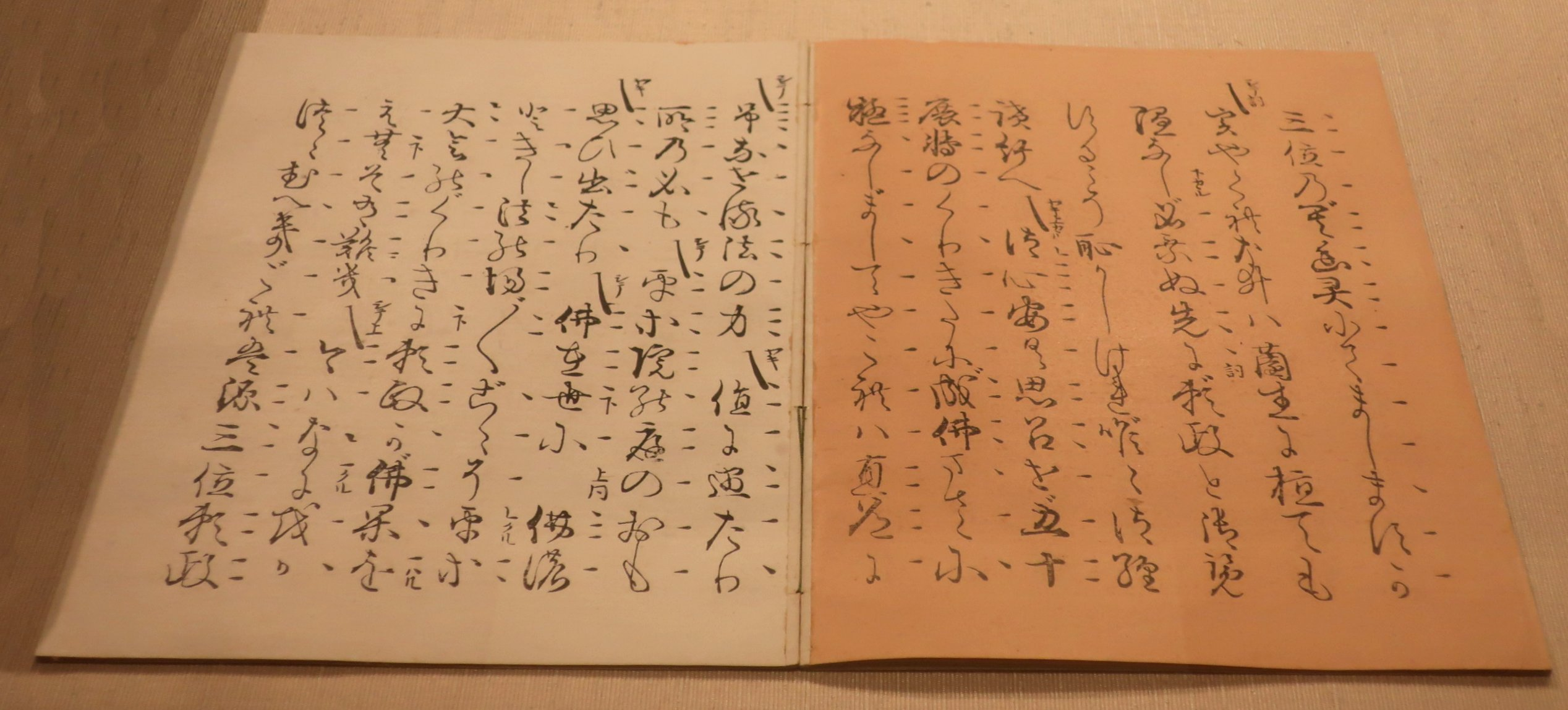
Saga-bon (嵯峨本, Saga Books): libretto for the Noh play Katsuragi by Hon'ami Kōetsu. The Saga-bon is one of the earliest works produced on a movable type press in Japan.

The great pioneers in applying movable type printing press to the creation of artistic books, and in preceding mass production for general consumption, were Honami Kōetsu and Suminokura Soan. At their studio in Saga, Kyoto, the pair created a number of woodblock versions of the Japanese classics, both text and images, essentially converting emakimono scroll into printed books, and reproducing them for wider consumption. These books, now known as Kōetsu Books, Suminokura Books, or Saga Books, are considered the first and finest printed reproductions of many of these classic tales; the Saga Book of the Tales of Ise (Ise monogatari), printed in 1608, is especially renowned. Saga Books were printed on expensive paper, and used various embellishments, being printed specifically for a small circle of literary connoisseurs. For aesthetic reasons, the typeface of the Saga-bon, like that of traditional handwritten books, adopted the renmen-tai (ja), in which several characters are written in succession with smooth brush strokes. As a result, a single typeface was sometimes created by combining two to four semi-cursive and cursive kanji or hiragana characters. In one book, 2,100 characters were created, but 16% of them were used only once.

Despite the appeal of moveable type, however, craftsmen soon decided that the semi-cursive and cursive script style of Japanese writings was better reproduced using woodblocks. By 1640 woodblocks were once again used for nearly all purposes. After the 1640s, movable type printing declined, and books were mass-produced by conventional woodblock printing during most of the Edo period. It was after the 1870s, during the Meiji period, when Japan opened the country to the West and began to modernize, that this technique was used again.

== Comparison of woodblock and movable type ==
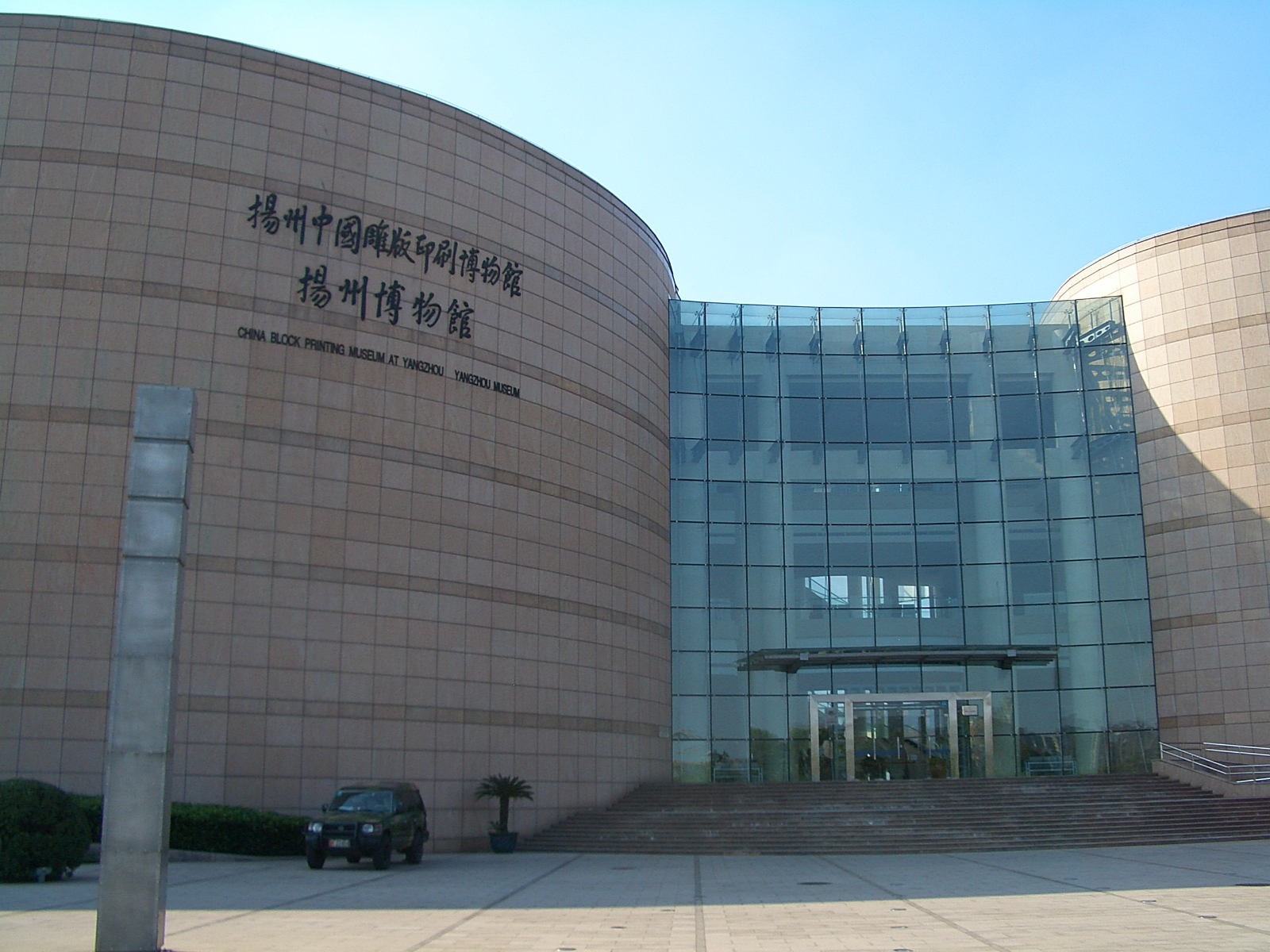
China Block Printing Museum in Yangzhou

Despite the introduction of movable type from the 11th century, printing using woodblocks remained dominant in East Asia until the introduction of lithography and photolithography in the 19th century. To understand this it is necessary to consider both the nature of the language and the economics of printing.

Given that the Chinese language does not use an alphabet it was usually necessary for a set of type to contain hundreds of thousands of blocks, which was a substantial investment. Common characters need 20 or more copies, and rarer characters only a single copy. In the case of wood, the characters were either produced in a large block and cut up, or the blocks were cut first and the characters cut afterwards. In either case the size and height of the type had to be carefully controlled to produce pleasing results. To handle the typesetting, Wang Zhen used revolving tables about 2 m (6 ft 7 in) in diameter in which the characters were divided according to the five tones and the rhyme sections according to the official book of rhymes. The characters were all numbered and one man holding the list called out the number to another who would fetch the type.

This system worked well when the run was large. Wang Zhen's initial project to produce 100 copies of a 60,000 character gazetteer of the local district was produced in less than a month. But for the smaller runs typical of the time it was not such an improvement. A reprint required resetting and re-proofreading, unlike the wooden block system where it was feasible to store the blocks and reuse them. Individual wooden characters didn't last as long as complete blocks. When metal type was introduced it was harder to produce aesthetically pleasing type by the direct carving method.

It is unknown whether metal movable types used from the late 15th century in China were cast from moulds or carved individually. Even if they were cast, there were not the economies of scale available with the small number of different characters used in an alphabetic system. The wage for engraving on bronze was many times that for carving characters on wood and a set of metal type might contain 200,000–400,000 characters. Additionally, the ink traditionally used in Chinese printing, typically composed of pine soot bound with glue, didn't work well with the tin originally used for type.

As a result of all this, movable type was initially used by government offices which needed to produce large number of copies and by itinerant printers producing family registers who would carry perhaps 20,000 pieces of wooden type with them and cut any other characters needed locally. But small local printers often found that wooden blocks suited their needs better.

== Mechanical presses ==
Mechanical printing presses were invented in Renaissance Europe by Johannes Gutenberg in the 15th century. Printing in East Asia remained largely as an unmechanized, laborious process with pressing the back of the paper onto the inked block by manual "rubbing" with a hand tool. Woodblock printing was slowly replaced in Qing dynasty China by Western printing presses during the 19th century, after the British Presbyterian missionary Robert Morrison and printer Peter Perring Thoms introduced the printing press in 1814 for publishing A Dictionary of the Chinese Language in Macau. Improving on the Chinese type developed by Samuel Dyer, the printer William Gamble of the American Presbyterian Mission Press (founded in Shanghai in 1860) introduced more efficient electrotype techniques to China, and by the 1870s Western lithography and photolithography began to challenge the predominance of woodblock printing. In Korea, the first printing presses were introduced as late as 1881–83, while in Japan, after an early but brief interlude in the 1590s, Gutenberg's printing press arrived in Nagasaki in 1848 on a Dutch ship.

== See also ==
- Auspicious Tantra of All-Reaching Union
- Four Great Inventions
- Glossary of ukiyo-e
- Hyakumantō Darani
- Jiaozi (currency)
- Kaibao Canon
- Kappazuri
- History of Western typography
- Paper money seal (China)
- Tripiṭaka Koreana
- Woodblock printing in Japan
- Woodblock printing in Korea
