= Youguo Temple =

Buddhist temple in Kaifeng, China

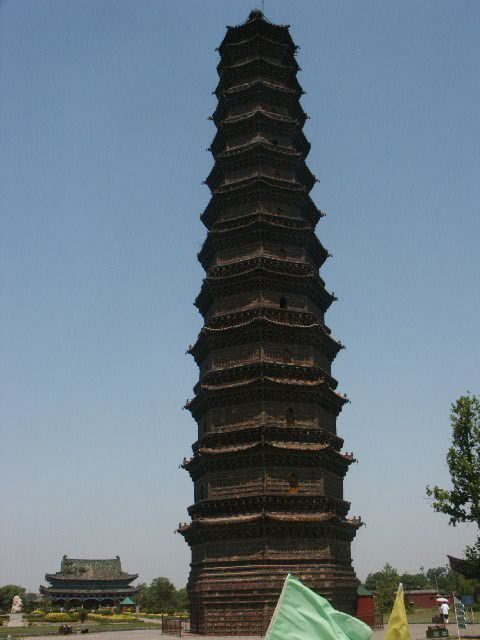
The glazed-brick Iron Pagoda, built in 1049, and the temple grounds

Youguo Temple (Chinese: 佑國寺) is a Buddhist monastery complex located northeast of Kaifeng, in Henan province, China. It was built during the Song dynasty (960–1279 CE). The design features the Iron Pagoda towering in the center of the complex, in a style that flourished in Chinese Buddhist temple architecture through the 11th century.

== History ==
The original temple was magnificent in scale with 280 halls and 24 monasteries. Kaifeng was the capital city of the Northern Song dynasty, and the temple was an important place that the emperors of the dynasty visited often. The imperial examinations were held at the temple, and applicants from throughout the Chinese empire came to take civil service exams.

== Pagodas ==
The temple's original pagoda was a mammoth octagonal wooden tower of thirteen stories. The eminent architect Yu Hao had designed and engineered it. In 1044, it was hit by lightning and burned to the ground.

=== Iron Pagoda ===
Emperor Renzong of the Northern Song dynasty ordered its replacement. It was designed to resemble the original wooden pagoda but built of glazed bricks so the tower would be fire-resistant and enduring. The 55-metre-high Iron Pagoda, built in 1049, is a solid core, octagonal brick tower with an inner spiral stone staircase and outside openings to allow light and air flow. The architectural style features densely positioned dougong in the eaves (miyan) and multiple storeys (louge). The glazed bricks, brown in color, gave the new tower its name, the Iron Pagoda.

The exterior features more than fifty different varieties of brick and 1,600 intricate and richly detailed carvings, including those of sitting Buddha, standing monks, singers and dancers, lions, dragons and other legendary beasts as well as many fine engravings. Under the eaves are 104 bells that ring in the wind. The foundation rests in the silt of the Yellow River. Inside the Iron Pagoda are frescos of the Chinese classical novel, the Journey to the West.

In 1847 the Yellow River overflowed its banks and the Youguo Temple collapsed, but the Iron Pagoda survived. Historically, the pagoda has experienced 38 earthquakes, six floods and many other disasters, but it remains intact after almost 1000 years.

== See also ==
- Architecture of Song dynasty
- List of Buddhist temples
