= The Badger of Ghissi =

1959 novel by Wolf von Niebelschütz

- Author: Wolf von Niebelschütz
- Original title: Die Kinder der Finsternis
- Translator: June Barrows Mussey
- Language: German
- Publisher: Diederichs
- Publication date: 1959
- Publication place: West Germany
- English publication date: 1963
- Pages: 545

The Badger of Ghissi (German: Die Kinder der Finsternis, lit. 'The Children of Darkness') is a 1959 novel by the German writer Wolf von Niebelschütz. It is set in the 12th century and follows Barral, originally a shepherd in Provence and the lone survivor of a Saracen attack, whose talents eventually make him an influential political figure. The novel portrays the social strata of medieval Europe.

Upon a republication in 2010, Jutta Ladwig of Literaturkritik.de wrote that the novel demands full attention and multiple sittings to allow its language to sink in. She wrote that it "51 years after its publication has lost nothing of its fascination and linguistic power".
