= Science and technology of the Song dynasty =

Aspect of Chinese history

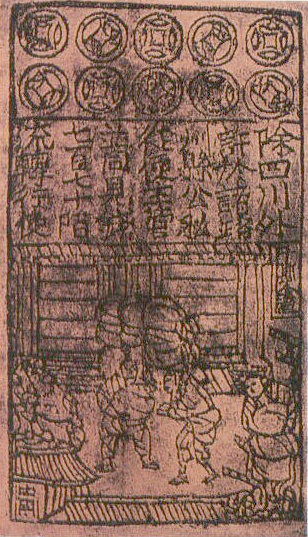
Jiaozi, the world's first paper-printed currency, a Song innovation

The Song dynasty (Chinese: 宋朝; 960–1279 CE) witnessed many substantial scientific and technological advances in Chinese history. Some of these advances and innovations were the products of talented statesmen and scholar-officials drafted by the government through imperial examinations. Shen Kuo (1031–1095), author of the Dream Pool Essays, is a prime example, an inventor and pioneering figure who introduced many new advances in Chinese astronomy and mathematics, establishing the concept of true north in the first known experiments with the magnetic compass. However, commoner craftsmen such as Bi Sheng (972–1051), the inventor of movable type printing (in a form predating the printing press of Johannes Gutenberg), were also heavily involved in technical innovations.

The ingenuity of advanced mechanical engineering had a long tradition in China. The Song engineer Su Song, who constructed a hydraulically-powered astronomical clocktower, admitted that he and his contemporaries were building upon the achievements of the ancients such as Zhang Heng (78–139), an astronomer, inventor, and early master of mechanical gears whose armillary sphere was automatically rotated by a waterwheel and clepsydra timer. The application of movable type printing advanced the already widespread use of woodblock printing to educate and amuse Confucian students and the masses. The application of new weapons employing the use of gunpowder enabled the Song to ward off its militant enemies—the Liao, Western Xia, and Jin with weapons such as cannons—until its collapse to the Mongol forces of Kublai Khan in the late 13th century.

Notable advances in civil engineering, nautics, and metallurgy were made in Song China, as well as the introduction of the windmill to China during the thirteenth century. These advances, along with the introduction of paper-printed money, helped revolutionize and sustain the economy of the Song dynasty. Song era antiquarians such as Ouyang Xiu (1007–1072) and Shen Kuo dabbled in the nascent field of archaeology and epigraphy, inspecting ancient bronzewares and inscriptions to understand the past. Advances were also made in the field of forensics, in particular by Song Ci (1186–1249), author of the Collected Cases of Injustice Rectified that covered topics such as autopsies in murder cases and first aid for victims.

== Polymaths and mechanical engineering ==
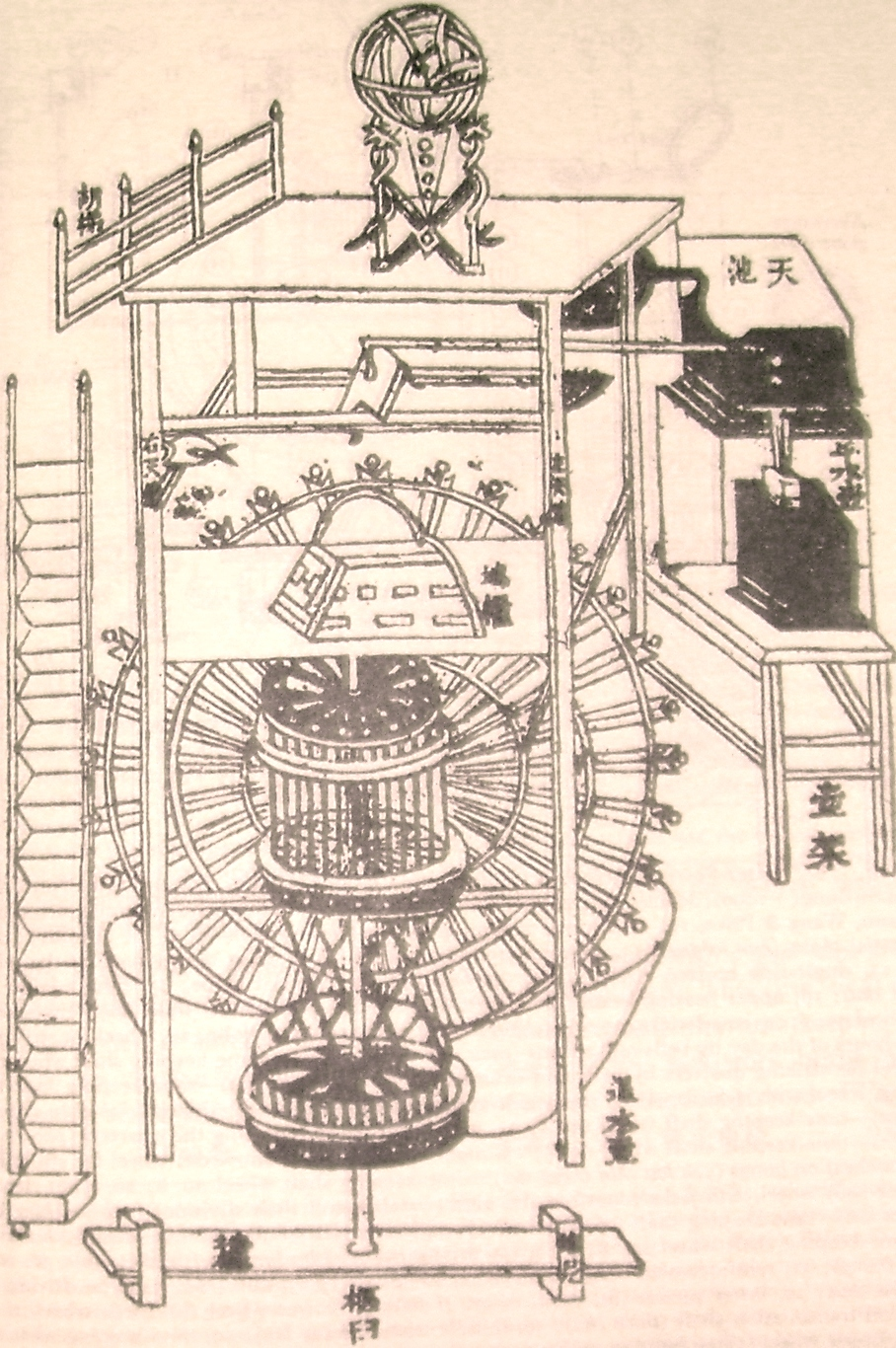
The original diagram of the book by Su Song in 1092, showing the inner workings of his clock tower, with the clepsydra tank, a waterwheel with scoops and the escapement, a chain drive, the armillary sphere crowning the top, and the rotating wheel with clock jacks that sounded the hours with bells, gongs, and drums.

=== Polymaths ===
Polymaths such as Shen Kuo (1031–1095) and Su Song (1020–1101) were active during the Song period, making contributions to technology and early empirical science. Shen described the concept of true north and magnetic declination toward the North Pole by refining measurements of the astronomical meridian and correcting the calculated position of the pole star. His work improved the accuracy of maritime navigation with the magnetic compass, which he also described in writing. Shen documented Bi Sheng’s invention of movable type printing and advanced geological theories, proposing long-term geomorphology and climate change on the basis of field observations. Drawing on knowledge of solar and lunar eclipses, he argued that the sun and moon were spherical, extending earlier Chinese astronomical ideas. Together with Wei Pu in the Bureau of Astronomy, Shen developed models for planetary motion, including retrograde motion, and carried out detailed observations of the moon’s orbital motion over five years. Their corrections to lunar and solar error were adopted at court, although revisions to planetary orbital paths were only partially accepted, possibly as a result of political opposition. Shen also conducted research in mathematics, geography, economics, medicine, art criticism, archaeology, military strategy, and diplomacy. He calculated the number of permutations in board games, modeled the maximum duration of a military campaign as a function of resupply logistics, improved scientific instruments such as the inflow clepsydra clock, the armillary sphere, the gnomon, and the astronomical sighting tube, and carried out early experiments with the camera obscura, following the earlier work of Ibn al-Haytham (965–1039).

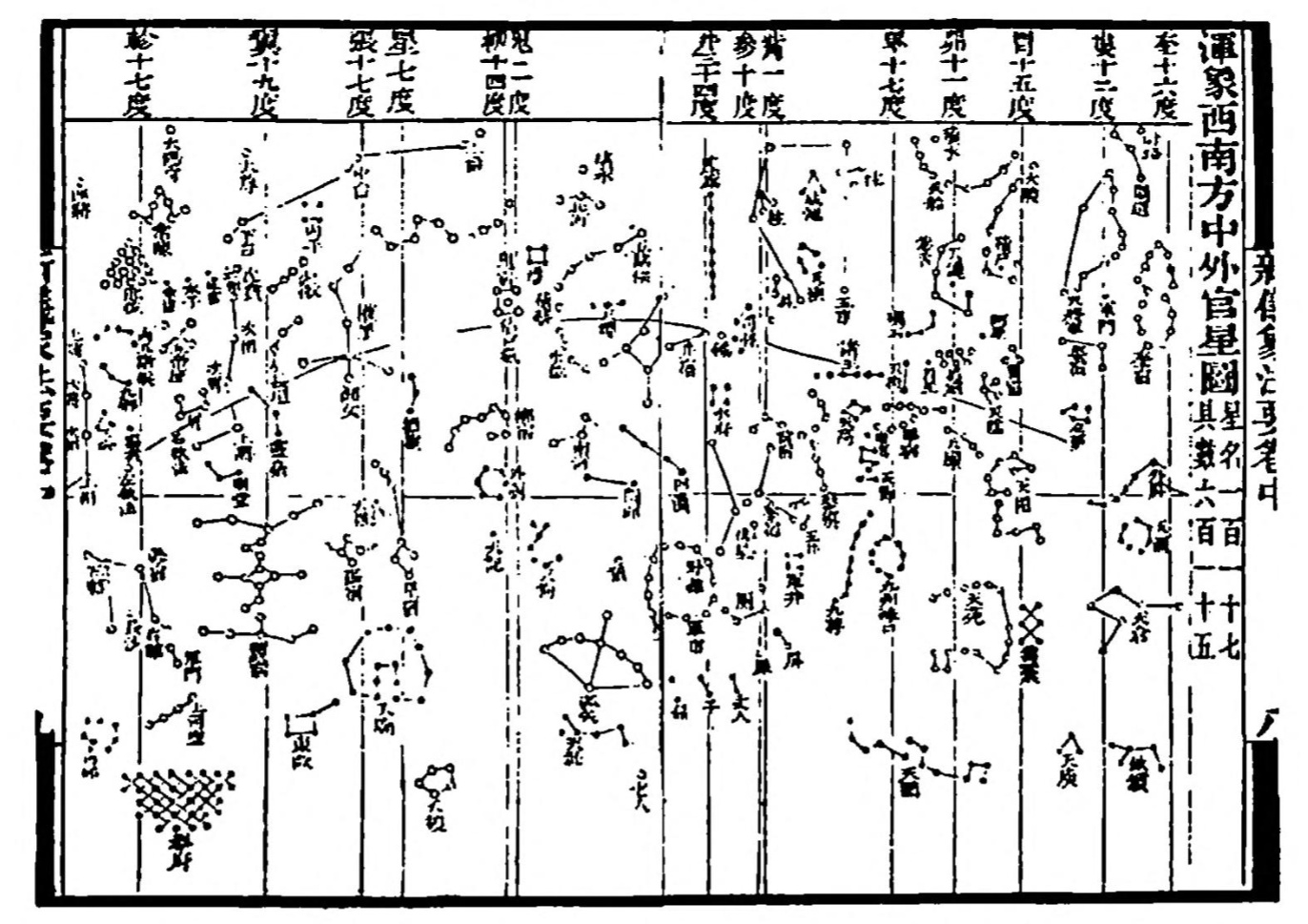
One of five star maps published in Su Song's horological and astronomical book of 1092 CE, featuring Shen Kuo's corrected position of the pole star using the cylindrical equirectangular projection

Su Song (1020–1101), a contemporary of Shen Kuo, compiled the Bencao Tujing in 1070, a pharmaceutical treatise that included sections on botany, zoology, metallurgy, and mineralogy. The work documented a range of medicinal practices, including the use of ephedrin. Su also produced a celestial atlas containing five star maps. His writings on cartography were used to resolve a border dispute between the Song dynasty and the Liao dynasty. In 1088, he directed the construction of a hydraulic-powered astronomical clock tower in Kaifeng, which incorporated a mechanically driven armillary sphere. The clock employed an escapement mechanism two centuries before its documented use in European clocks, and featured a power-transmitting chain drive described in his horological treatise of 1092.

=== Odometer and south-pointing chariot ===
There were many other important figures in the Song era besides Shen Kuo and Su Song, many of whom contributed greatly to the technological innovations of the time period. Although the mechanically driven mile-marking device of the carriage-drawn odometer had been known in China since the ancient Han dynasty, the Song Shi (compiled in 1345) provides a much greater description and more in-depth view of the device than earlier Chinese sources. The Song Shi states:

The odometer. [The mile-measuring carriage] is painted red, with pictures of flowers and birds on the four sides, and constructed in two storeys, handsomely adorned with carvings. At the completion of every li, the wooden figure of a man in the lower storey strikes a drum; at the completion of every ten li, the wooden figure in the upper storey strikes a bell. The carriage-pole ends in a phoenix-head, and the carriage is drawn by four horses. The escort was formerly of 18 men, but in the 4th year of the Yongxi reign period (987) the emperor Taizong increased it to 30. In the 5th year of the Tian-Sheng reign-period (1027) the Chief Chamberlain Lu Daolong presented specifications for the construction of odometers as follows: [...]

What follows is a long dissertation made by the Chief Chamberlain Lu Daolong on the ranging measurements and sizes of wheels and gears. However, the concluding paragraph provides description at the end of how the device ultimately functions:

When the middle horizontal wheel has made 1 revolution, the carriage will have gone 1 li and the wooden figure in the lower story will strike the drum. When the upper horizontal wheel has made 1 revolution, the carriage will have gone 10 li and the figure in the upper storey will strike the bell. The number of wheels used, great and small, is 8 inches (200 mm) in all, with a total of 285 teeth. Thus the motion is transmitted as if by the links of a chain, the "dog-teeth" mutually engaging with each other, so that by due revolution everything comes back to its original starting point.

In the Song period (and once during the earlier Tang period), the odometer device was combined with the south-pointing chariot device, which was probably first invented by the ancient Chinese mechanical engineer Ma Jun (200–265). The south-pointing chariot was a wheeled vehicle that may, in some cases, have incorporated complex differential gears. (These are used now in nearly all modern automobiles to apply equal amounts of torque to wheels rotating at different speeds while turning.) The differential gears could have been used to keep a mechanically operated pointer aiming in a fixed direction, to the south, compensating for whatever turns the chariot made. Other arrangements of gears could also have been used for the same purpose. The device used mechanical dead reckoning, rather than the magnetism of a compass, in order to navigate and find one's directional bearings. Yan Su (燕肃; c. 961–1040), the Divisional Director in the Ministry of Works, recreated a south-pointing chariot device in 1027, and his specifications for creating the device were provided in the Song Shi. This is of little surprise, as Yan was somewhat of a polymath like Shen Kuo and Su Song, improving the design of the clepsydra clock, writing on mathematical harmonics, theory about tides, etc. The Song Shi text records that it was the engineer Wu Deren who combined the south-pointing chariot and odometer in the year 1107:

In the first year of the Da-Guan reign period (1107), the Chamberlain Wu Deren presented specifications of the south-pointing carriage and the carriage with the li-recording drum (odometer). The two vehicles were made, and were first used that year at the great ceremony of the ancestral sacrifice.

The text then went on to describe in full detail the intricate mechanical design for the two devices combined into one. (See the article on the south-pointing chariot).

=== Revolving repositories ===
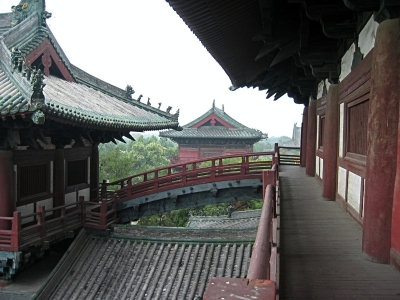
The Longxing Monastery, home to the oldest extant Chinese mechanical revolving-repository book case

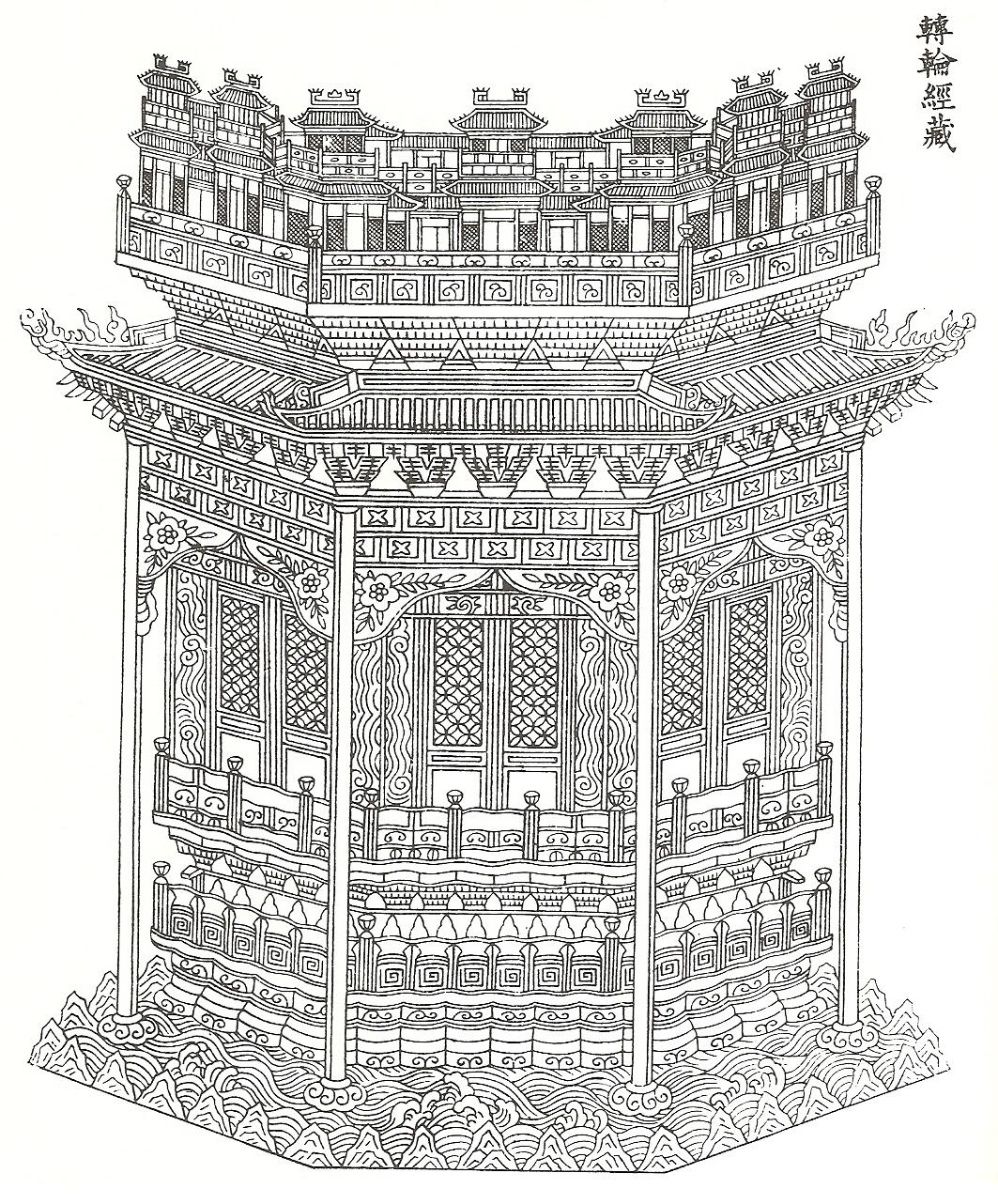
Revolving book case in Yingzao Fashi

Besides clockwork, hydraulic-powered armillary spheres, odometers, and mechanical compass vehicles, there were other impressive devices of mechanical engineering found during the Song dynasty. Although literary references for mechanical revolving repositories and book cases of Buddhist temples trace back to at least 823 during the Tang dynasty, they came to prominence during the Song dynasty. The invention of the revolving book case is considered to have happened earlier, and is credited to the layman Fu Xi in 544. Revolving bookcases were popularized in Buddhist monasteries during the Song dynasty under the reign of Emperor Taizu, who ordered the mass printing of the Buddhist Tripiṭaka scriptures. Furthermore, the oldest surviving rotating book case dates to the Song period (12th century), found at the Longxing Monastery of Zhengding, Hebei province. However, there were nine prominently known revolving repositories during the Song period, and one of them was even featured in an illustration of Li Jie's book Yingzao Fashi ('Treatise on Architectural Methods') of 1103. The rotating repository of 1119 in Kaifu Temple near Changsha had five wheels which all turned together, and the revolving repository at Nanchan Temple of Suzhou featured a brake system of some sort (sinologists are still uncertain how this operated, since the earliest known curve brake bands appear in the time of Leonardo da Vinci in Europe). A later Muslim traveler Shah Rukh (son of the Turco-Mongol warlord Timur) came to Ming dynasty China in 1420 during the reign of the Yongle Emperor, and described a revolving repository in Ganzhou of Gansu province that he called a 'kiosque':

In another temple there is an octagonal kiosque, having from the top to the bottom fifteen stories. Each story contains apartments decorated with lacquer in the Cathayan manner, with ante-rooms and verandahs...It is entirely made of polished wood, and this again gilded so admirably that it seems to be of solid gold. There is a vault below it. An iron shaft fixed in the center of the kiosque traverses it from bottom to top, and the lower end of this works in an iron plate, whilst the upper end bears on strong supports in the roof of the edifice which contains this pavilion. Thus a person in the vault can with a trifling exertion cause this great kiosque to revolve. All the carpenters, smiths, and painters in the world would learn something in their trades by coming here!

=== Textile machinery ===
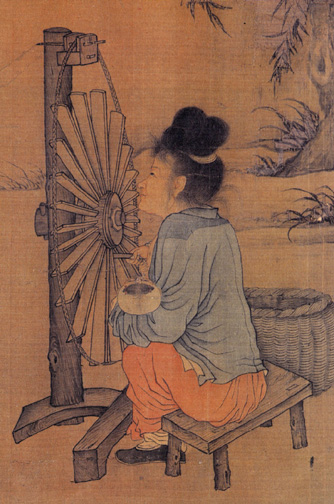
Detail of The Spinning Wheel, by Wang Juzheng, Northern Song era (960–1127).

In the field of manufacturing textiles, Joseph Needham (1900–1995) wrote that the Chinese invented the quilling-wheel by the 12th century, and wrote the mechanical belt drive was known since the 11th century. Qin Guan's book Can Shu (Book of Sericulture) of 1090 described a silk-reeling machine with an oscillating 'proto-flyer', as the apparatus of the main reel of which the silk is bound is wound and powered by treadle motion. In this device the ramping arm of the flyer was activated simultaneously by a subsidiary belt drive. This machine was portrayed in an illustration of the Geng Zhi Tu book of 1237, and again a more elaborate illustration was provided in a 17th-century book. Qin Guan's 1090 book stated that:

The pulley (bearing the eccentric lug) is provided with a groove for the reception of the driving belt, an endless band which responds to the movement of the machine by continuously rotating the pulley.

An endless rope or cord may have been used in Du Shi's device of waterwheels that powered bellows of the blast furnace in the 1st century (see Wind Power below).

== Movable type printing ==
Printing technology in the form of movable type was invented by Bi Sheng (毕升; 990–1051) in the 11th century. The work of Bi Sheng was written of by Shen Kuo in his Dream Pool Essays (Mengxi Bitan). Movable type, alongside woodblock printing, increased literacy with the mass production of printed materials. This meant that parents could encourage sons to learn to read and write and therefore be able to take the imperial examination and become part of the growing learned bureaucracy. Movable type printing was further advanced in Joseon era Korea, where Bi Sheng's baked clay characters were scrapped for metal type characters in 1234. The movable type of Bi Sheng was later improved upon by Wang Zhen (1290–1333), who invented wooden movable type c. 1298, and Hua Sui (1439–1513), who invented bronze movable type in China in 1490; yet the Koreans had metal movable type before Hua Sui, and even Wang Zhen had experimented with tin-metal movable type. Although movable type and woodblock printing would remain the dominant types of printing methods for centuries, the European printing press (employing the Hellenistic screw-press) was eventually adopted by East Asian countries.

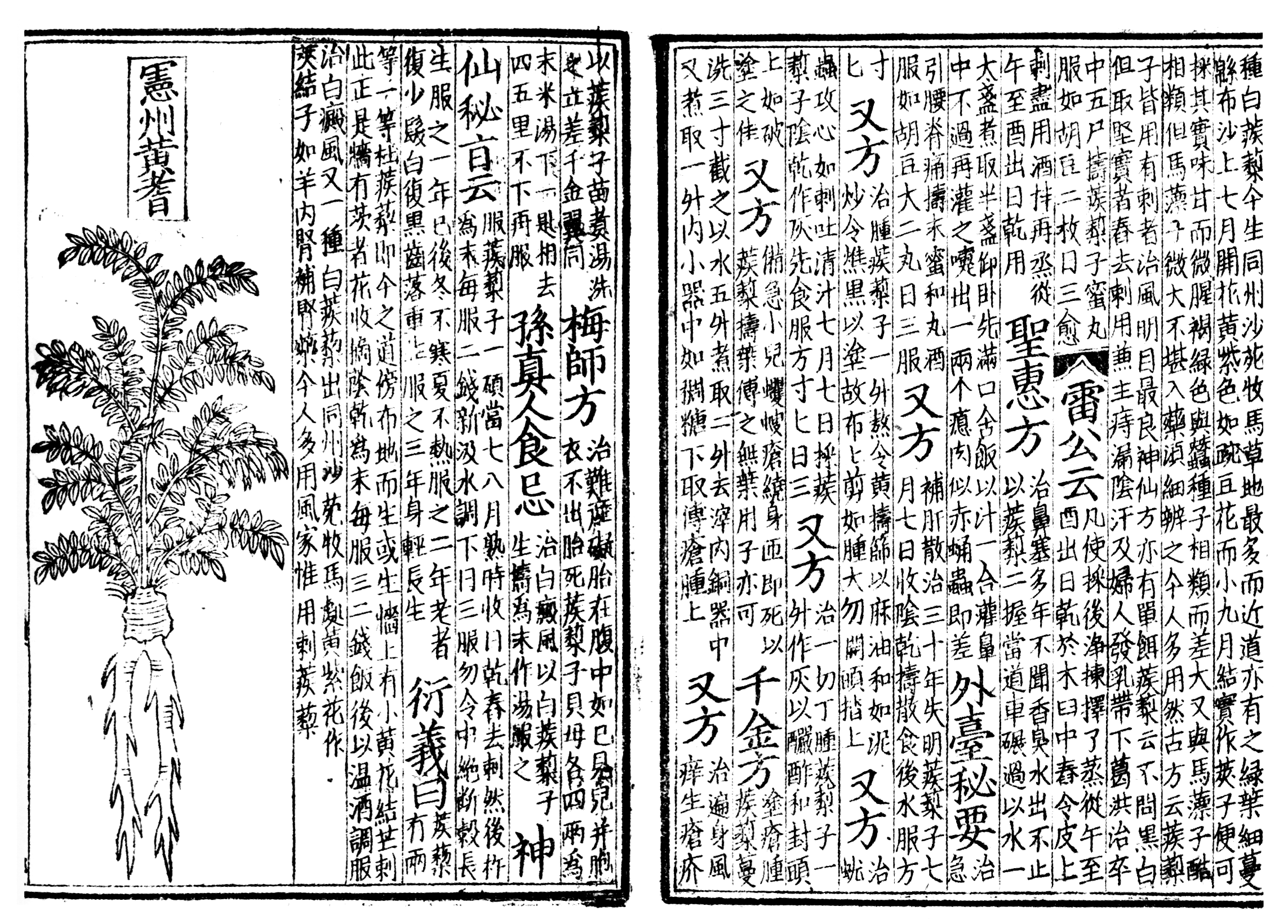
The Bencao on traditional Chinese medicine; printed with woodblock in 1249, Song dynasty

For printing, the mass production of paper for writing was already well established in China. The papermaking process had been perfected and standardized by the Han dynasty court eunuch Cai Lun (50–121) in 105, and was in widespread use for writing even by the 3rd century. The Song dynasty was the world's first government in history to issue paper-printed money—the banknote (see Jiaozi and Huizi). Toilet paper had been in general use in China since the 6th century, paper bags for preserving the flavor of tea leaves by the 7th century, and by the Song dynasty government officials who had done a great service were rewarded by the court with gifts of paper-printed money wrapped in paper envelopes. During the Song dynasty, independent and government sponsored industries were developed to meet the needs of a growing population that had reached over 100 million. For example, for the printing of paper money alone, the Song court established several government-run mints and factories in the cities of Huizhou, Chengdu, Hangzhou, and Anqi. The size of the workforce employed in these paper money factories was quite large, as it was recorded in 1175 that the factory at Hangzhou alone employed more than a thousand workers a day.

== Gunpowder warfare ==
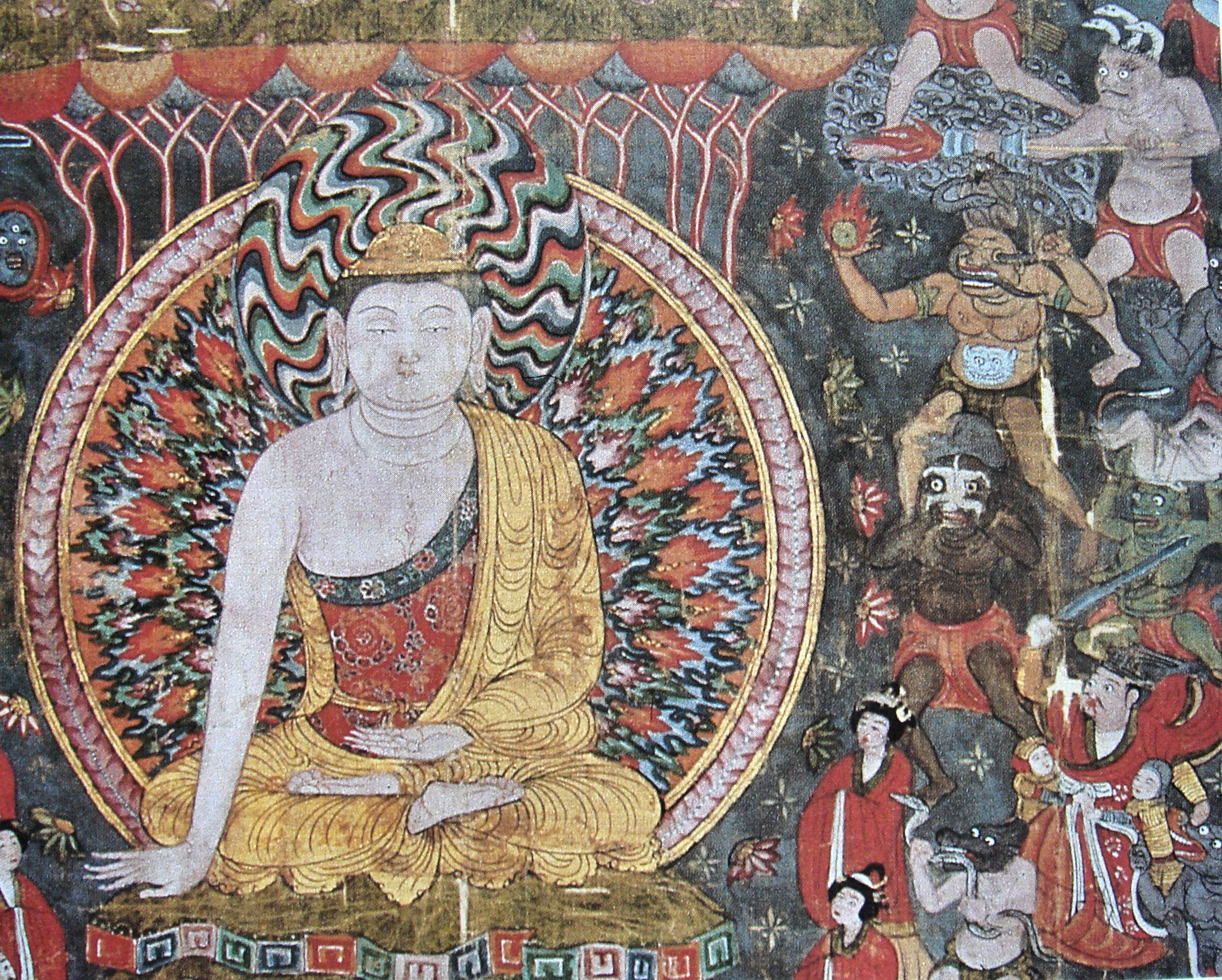
Earliest known representation of a gun (a fire lance) and a grenade (upper right), from the cave murals at Dunhuang, c. 950 CE

=== Flamethrower ===
Advances in military technology aided the Song dynasty in its defense against hostile neighbors to the north. The flamethrower found its origins in Byzantine-era Greece, employing Greek fire (a chemically complex, highly flammable petrol fluid) in a device with a siphon hose by the 7th century. The earliest reference to Greek Fire in China was made in 917, written by Wu Renchen in his Spring and Autumn Annals of the Ten Kingdoms. In 919, the siphon projector-pump was used to spread the 'fierce fire oil' that could not be doused with water, as recorded by Lin Yu in his Wuyue Beishi, hence the first credible Chinese reference to the flamethrower employing the chemical solution of Greek fire (see also Pen Huo Qi). Lin Yu mentioned also that the 'fierce fire oil' derived ultimately from one of China's maritime contacts in the 'southern seas', Arabia (Dashiguo). In the Battle of Langshan Jiang in 919, the naval fleet of the Wenmu King from Wuyue defeated a Huainan army from the Wu state; Wenmu's success was facilitated by the use of 'fire oil' ('huo you') to burn their fleet, signifying the first Chinese use of gunpowder in a battle. The Chinese applied the use of double-piston bellows to pump petrol out of a single cylinder (with an upstroke and downstroke), lit at the end by a slow-burning gunpowder match to fire a continuous stream of flame. This device was featured in description and illustration of the Wujing Zongyao military manuscript of 1044. In the suppression of the Southern Tang state by 976, early Song naval forces confronted them on the Yangtze River in 975. Southern Tang forces attempted to use flamethrowers against the Song navy, but were accidentally consumed by their own fire when violent winds swept in their direction.

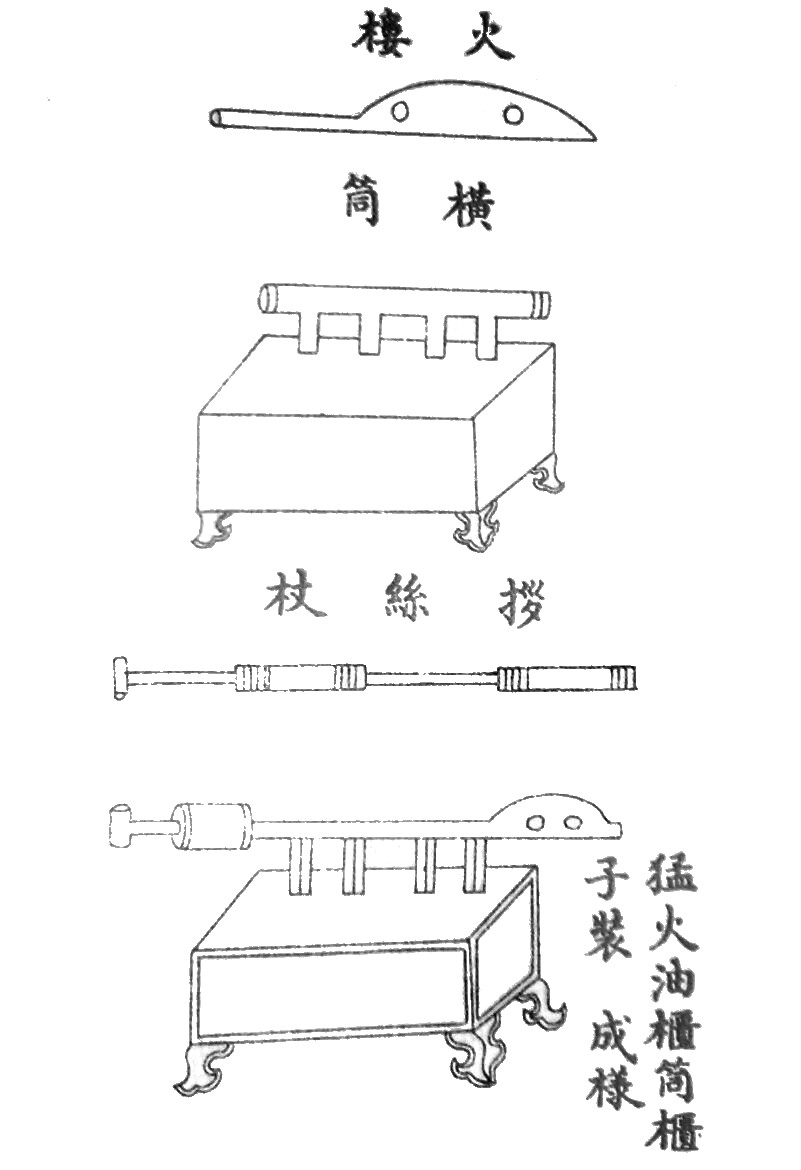
A Chinese flamethrower from the Wujing Zongyao manuscript of 1044 CE, Song dynasty

=== Fire lance ===
Although the destructive effects of gunpowder were described in the earlier Tang dynasty by a Daoist alchemist, the earliest-known existent written formulas for gunpowder come from the Wujing Zongyao text of 1044, which described explosive bombs hurled from catapults. The earliest developments of the gun barrel and the projectile-fire cannon were found in late Song China. The first art depiction of the Chinese 'fire lance' (a combination of a temporary-fire flamethrower and gun) was from a Buddhist mural painting of Dunhuang, dated circa 950. These 'fire-lances' were widespread in use by the early 12th century, featuring hollowed bamboo poles as tubes to fire sand particles (to blind and choke), lead pellets, bits of sharp metal and pottery shards, and finally large gunpowder-propelled arrows and rocket weaponry. Eventually, perishable bamboo was replaced with hollow tubes of cast iron, and so too did the terminology of this new weapon change, from 'fire-spear' ('huo qiang') to 'fire-tube' ('huo tong'). This ancestor to the gun was complemented by the ancestor to the cannon, what the Chinese referred to since the 13th century as the 'multiple bullets magazine erupter' ('bai zu lian zhu pao'), a tube of bronze or cast iron that was filled with about 100 lead balls. In 1132, at the siege of De'an, Song Chinese forces used fire lances against the rival Jurchen-led Jin dynasty.

=== Gun ===
An early known depiction of a gun is a sculpture from a cave in Sichuan, dating to 1128, that portrays a figure carrying a vase-shaped bombard, firing flames and a cannonball. However, the oldest existent archaeological discovery of a metal barrel handgun is the Heilongjiang hand cannon from the Chinese Heilongjiang excavation, dated to 1288. The Chinese also discovered the explosive potential of packing hollowed cannonball shells with gunpowder. Written later by Jiao Yu in his Huolongjing (mid 14th century), this manuscript recorded an earlier Song-era cast-iron cannon known as the 'flying-cloud thunderclap eruptor' (fei yun pi-li pao). The manuscript stated that:

The shells are made of cast iron, as large as a bowl and shaped like a ball. Inside they contain half a pound of 'magic' gunpowder. They are sent flying towards the enemy camp from an eruptor; and when they get there a sound like a thunder-clap is heard, and flashes of light appear. If ten of these shells are fired successfully into the enemy camp, the whole place will be set ablaze...

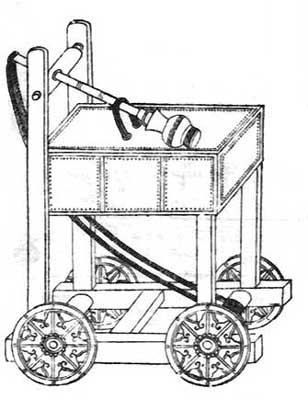
An illustration of a trebuchet catapult, as described in the Wujing Zongyao of 1044.

As noted before, the change in terminology for these new weapons during the Song period were gradual. The early Song cannons were at first termed the same way as the Chinese trebuchet catapult. A later Ming dynasty scholar known as Mao Yuanyi would explain this use of terminology and true origins of the cannon in his text of the Wubei Zhi, written in 1628:

The Song people used the turntable trebuchet, the single-pole trebuchet and the squatting-tiger trebuchet. They were all called 'fire trebuchets' because they were used to project fire-weapons like the (fire-)ball, (fire-)falcon, and (fire-)lance. They were the ancestors of the cannon.

=== Land mine ===
The 14th century Huolongjing was also one of the first Chinese texts to carefully describe to the use of explosive land mines, which had been used by the late Song Chinese against the Mongols in 1277, and employed by the Yuan dynasty afterwards. The innovation of the detonated land mine was accredited to one Luo Qianxia in the campaign of defense against the Mongol invasion by Kublai Khan, Later Chinese texts revealed that the Chinese land mine employed either a rip cord or a motion booby trap of a pin releasing falling weights that rotated a steel flint wheel, which in turn created sparks that ignited the train of fuses for the land mines.

=== Rocket ===
Furthermore, the Song employed the earliest known gunpowder-propelled rockets in warfare during the late 13th century, its earliest form being the archaic fire arrow. When the Northern Song capital of Kaifeng fell to the Jurchens in 1126, it was written by Xia Shaozeng that 20,000 fire arrows were handed over to the Jurchens in their conquest. An even earlier Chinese text of the Wujing Zongyao ("Collection of the Most Important Military Techniques"), written in 1044 by the Song scholars Zeng Kongliang and Yang Weide, described the use of three spring or triple bow arcuballista that fired arrow bolts holding gunpowder packets near the head of the arrow. Going back yet even farther, the Wu Li Xiao Shi (1630, second edition 1664) of Fang Yizhi stated that fire arrows were presented to Emperor Taizu of Song (r. 960–976) in 960.

== Civil engineering ==
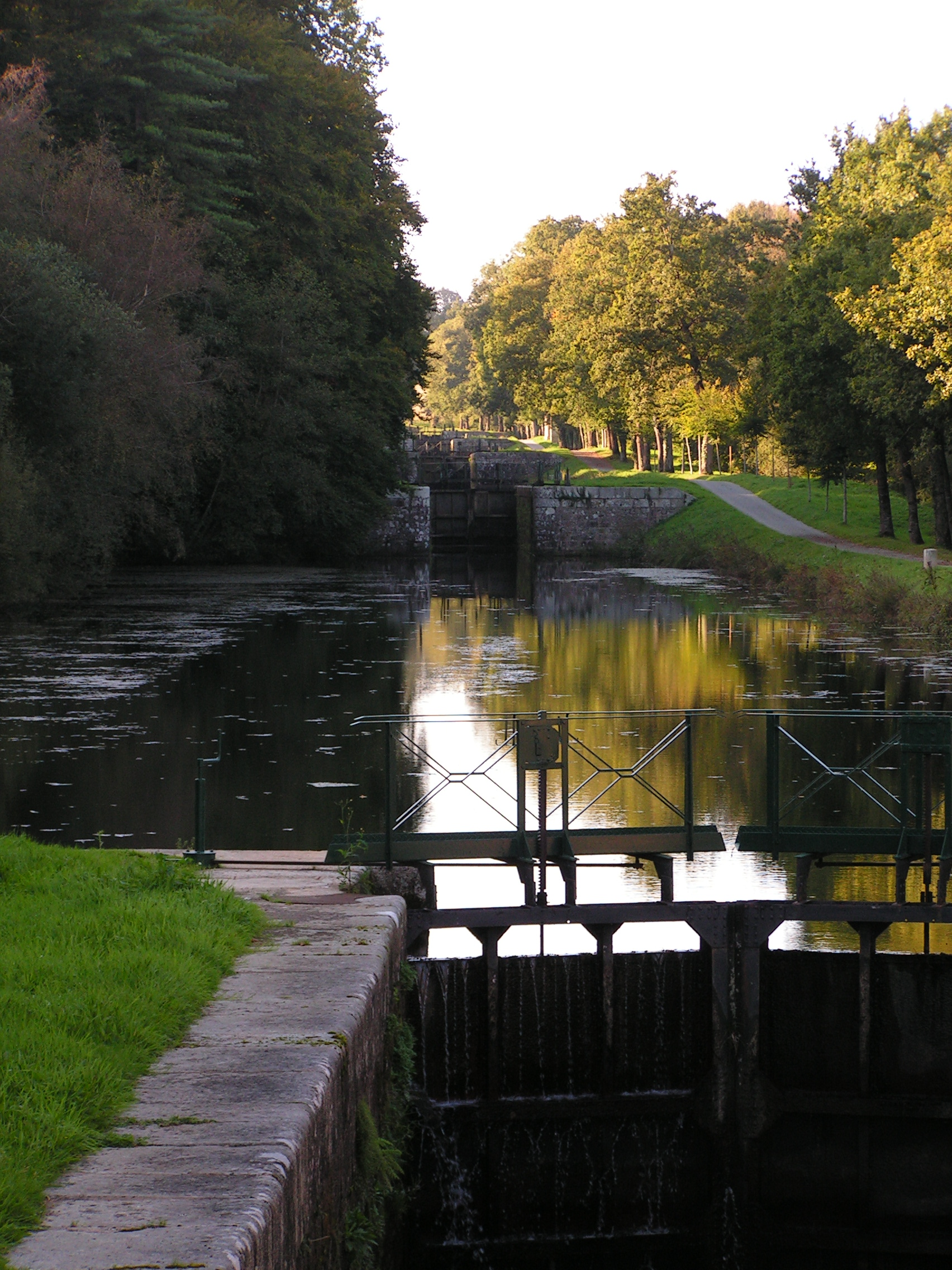
A canal lock system in modern-day France which uses the pound lock system developed during the Song dynasty.

In ancient China, the sluice gate, the canal lock, and flash lock had been known since at least the 1st century BCE (as sources then alluded that they were not new innovations), during the ancient Han dynasty (202 BCE–220 CE). During the Song dynasty the pound lock was first invented in 984 by the Assistant Commissioner of Transport for Huainan, the engineer Qiao Weiyue. In his day, the Chinese became concerned with a barge traffic problem at the Shanyang Yundao section of the Grand Canal, as ships often became wrecked while passing the double slipways and were robbed of the tax grain by local bandits. The historical text of the Song Shi (compiled in 1345) stated that in 984:

Qiao Weiyue also built five double slipways (lit. dams) between Anbei and Huaishi (or, the quays on the Huai waterfront). Each of these had ten lanes for the barges to go up and down. Their cargoes of imperial tax-grain were heavy, and as they were passing over they often came to grief and were damaged or wrecked, with loss of the grain and peculation by a cabal of the workers in league with local bandits hidden nearby. Qiao Weiyue therefore first ordered the construction of two gates at the third dam along the West River (near Huaiyin). The distance between the two gates was rather more than 50 paces (250 ft) and the whole space was covered over with a great roof like a shed. The gates were 'hanging gates'; (when they were closed) the water accumulated like a tide until the required level was reached, and then when the time came it was allowed to flow out. He also built a horizontal bridge to protect their foundations. After this was done (to all the double slipways) the previous corruption was completely eliminated, and the passage of the boats went on without the slightest impediment.

Diagram of a canal pound lock, invented in the 10th century and written of by Shen Kuo.

This practice became widespread, and was even written of by the Chinese polymath scientist Shen Kuo in his Dream Pool Essays (1088). Shen Kuo wrote that the establishment of pound lock gates at Zhenzhou (presumably Kuozhou along the Yangtze) during the Tian Sheng reign period (1023–1031) freed up the use of five hundred working laborers at the canal each year, amounting to the saving of up to 1,250,000 strings of cash annually. He wrote that the old method of hauling boats over limited the size of the cargo to 300 tan of rice per vessel (roughly 21 long tons/21,000 kg), but after the pound locks were introduced, boats carrying 400 tan (roughly 28 long tons/28,000 kg) could then be used. Shen wrote that by his time (c. 1080) government boats could carry cargo weights of up to 700 tan (49.5 long tons/50,300 kg), while private boats could hold as much as 800 bags, each weighing 2 tan (i.e. 113 long tons/115,000 kg). Shen Kuo also noted that proper use of sluice gates at irrigation canals was the best means of using silt for fertilizer. However, agricultural and transportation needs had the potential to conflict with one another. This is best represented in the Dongpo Zhilin of the governmental official and famous poet Su Shi (1037–1101), who wrote about two decades before Shen Kuo in 1060:

Several years ago the government built sluice gates for the silt fertilization method, though many people disagreed with the plan. In spite of all opposition it was carried through, yet it had little success. When the torrents on Fan Shan were abundant, the gates were kept closed, and this caused damage (by flooding) of fields, tombs, and houses. When the torrents subsided in the late autumn the sluices were opened, and thus the fields were irrigated with silt-bearing water, but the deposit was not as thick as what the peasants call 'steamed cake silt' (so they were not satisfied). Finally the government got tired of it and stopped. In this connection I remember reading the Jiayipan of Bai Juyi (the poet) in which he says that he once had a position as Traffic Commissioner. As the Bian River was getting so shallow that it hindered the passage of boats he suggested that the sluice gates along the river and canal should be closed, but the Military Governor pointed out that the river was bordered on both sides by fields which supplied army grain, and if these were denied irrigation (water and silt) because of the closing of the sluice gates, it would lead to shortages in army grain supplies. From this I learnt that in the Tang period there were government fields and sluice gates on both sides of the river, and that irrigation was carried on (continuously) even when the water was high. If this could be done (successfully) in old times, why can it not be done now? I should like to enquire further about the matter from experts.

Although the drydock had been known in Ptolemaic Egypt since the late 3rd century BCE (by a Phoenician; not used again until Henry VII of England in 1495), the scientist and statesman Shen Kuo wrote of its use in China to repair boats during the 11th century. In his Dream Pool Essays (1088), Shen Kuo wrote:

At the beginning of the dynasty (c. 965) the two Zhe provinces (now Zhejiang and southern Jiangsu) presented (to the throne) two dragon ships each more than (60.00 m/200 ft) in length. The upper works included several decks with palatial cabins and saloons, containing thrones and couches all ready for imperial tours of inspection. After many years, their hulls decayed and needed repairs, but the work was impossible as long as they were afloat. So in the Xi-Ning reign period (1068 to 1077) a palace official Huang Huaixin suggested a plan. A large basin was excavated at the north end of the Jinming Lake capable of containing the dragon ships, and in it heavy crosswise beams were laid down upon a foundation of pillars. Then (a breach was made) so that the basin quickly filled with water, after which the ships were towed in above the beams. The (breach now being closed) the water was pumped out by wheels so that the ships rested quite in the air. When the repairs were complete, the water was let in again, so that the ships were afloat once more (and could leave the dock). Finally the beams and pillars were taken away, and the whole basin covered over with a great roof so as to form a hangar in which the ships could be protected from the elements and avoid the damage caused by undue exposure.

== Nautics ==
=== Background ===
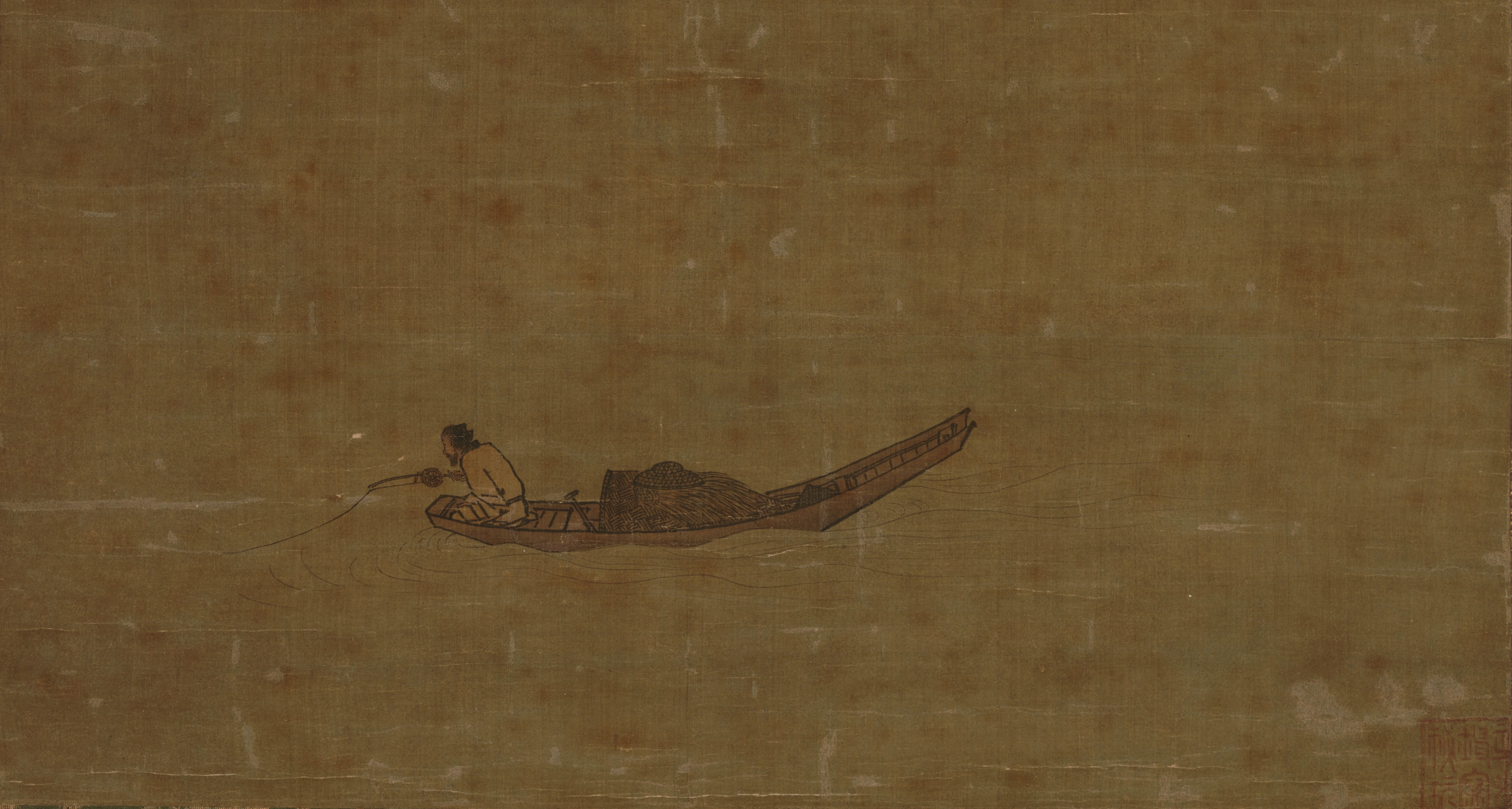
"Angler on a Wintry Lake", painted in 1195 by Ma Yuan, featuring the oldest known depiction of a fishing reel

The Chinese of the Song dynasty were adept sailors who traveled to ports of call as far away as Fatimid Egypt. They were well equipped for their journeys abroad, in large seagoing vessels steered by stern-post rudders and guided by the directional compass. Even before Shen Kuo and Zhu Yu had described the mariner's magnetic needle compass, the earlier military treatise of the Wujing Zongyao in 1044 had also described a thermoremanence compass. This was a simple iron or steel needle that was heated, cooled, and placed in a bowl of water, producing the effect of weak magnetization, although its use was described only for navigation on land and not at sea.

=== Literature ===
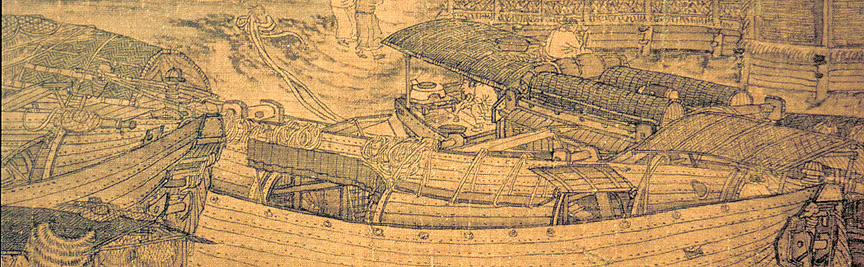
Detail of river vessels docking at Kaifeng, from Along the River During Qingming Festival, by Zhang Zeduan (1085–1145).

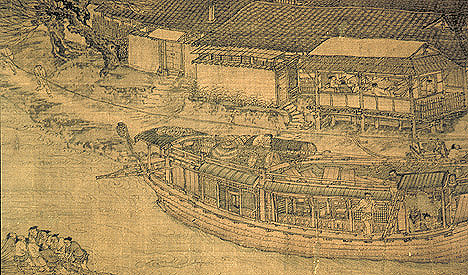
Another close-up view of the detail of Along the River.

There were plenty of descriptions in Chinese literature of the time on the operations and aspects of seaports, maritime merchant shipping, overseas trade, and the sailing ships themselves. In 1117, the author Zhu Yu wrote not only of the magnetic compass for navigation, but also a hundred-foot line with a hook that was cast over the deck of the ship, used to collect mud samples at the bottom of the sea in order for the crew to determine their whereabouts by the smell and appearance of the mud. In addition, Zhu Yu wrote of watertight bulkhead compartments in the hulls of ships to prevent sinking if damaged, the for-and-aft lug, taut mat sails, and the practice of beating-to-windward. Confirming Zhu Yu's writing on Song dynasty ships with bulkhead hull compartments, in 1973 a 78-foot (24 m) long, 29-foot (8.8 m) wide Song trade ship from c. 1277 was dredged from the water near the southern coast of China that contained 12 bulkhead compartment rooms in its hull. Maritime culture during the Song period was enhanced by these new technologies, along with the allowance of greater river and canal traffic. All around there was a bustling display of government run grain-tax transport ships, tribute vessels and barges, private shipping vessels, a multitude of busy fishers in small fishing boats, along with the rich enjoying the comforts of their luxurious private yachts.

Besides Zhu Yu there were other prominent Chinese authors of maritime interests as well. In 1178, the Guangzhou customs officer Zhou Qufei, who wrote in Lingwai Daida about the Arab slave trade of Africans as far as Madagascar, stated this about Chinese seagoing ships, their sizes, durability at sea, and the lives of those on board:

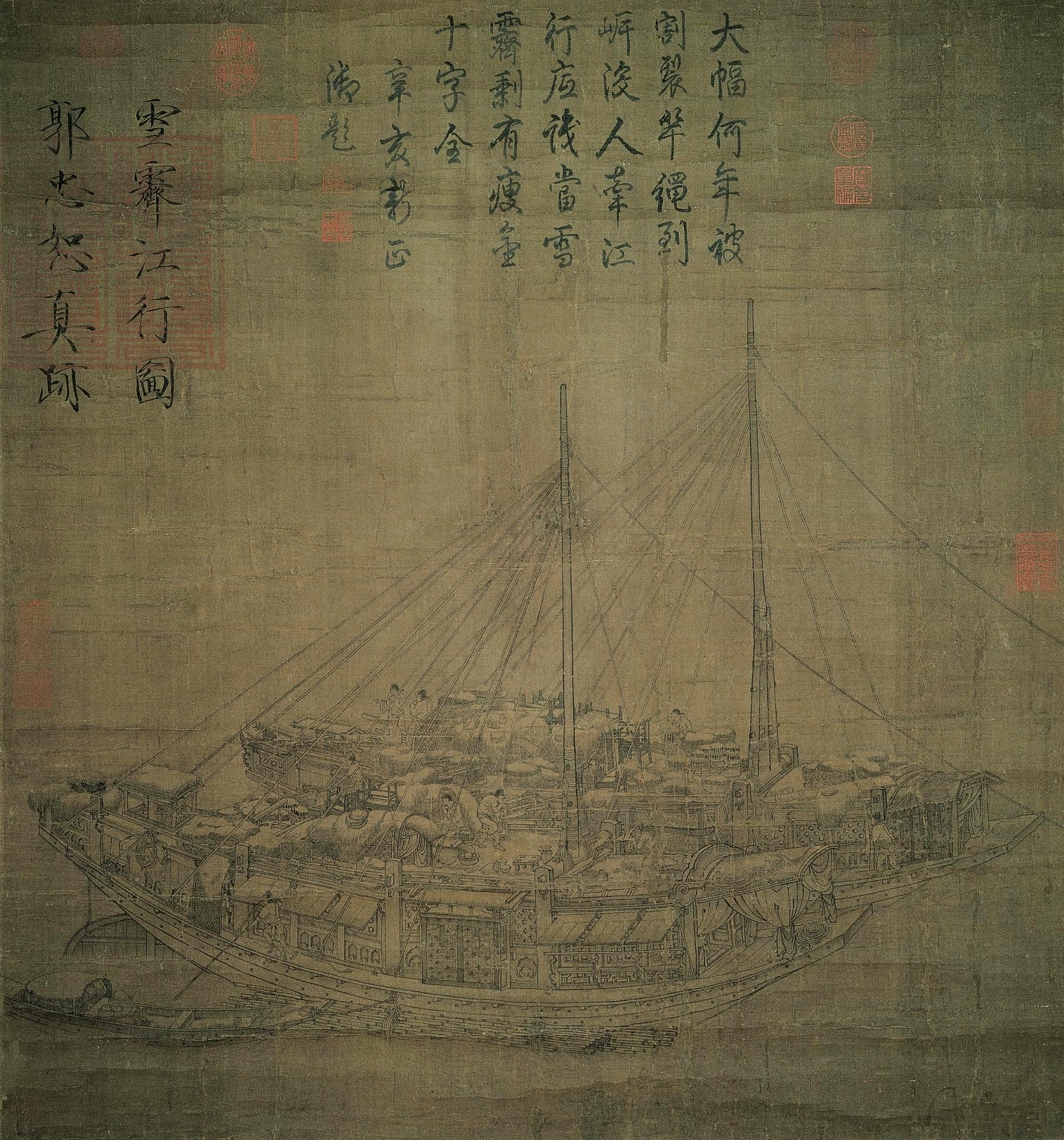
A Song painting on silk of two Chinese cargo ships accompanied by a smaller boat; notice the large stern-mounted rudder on the ship shown in the foreground

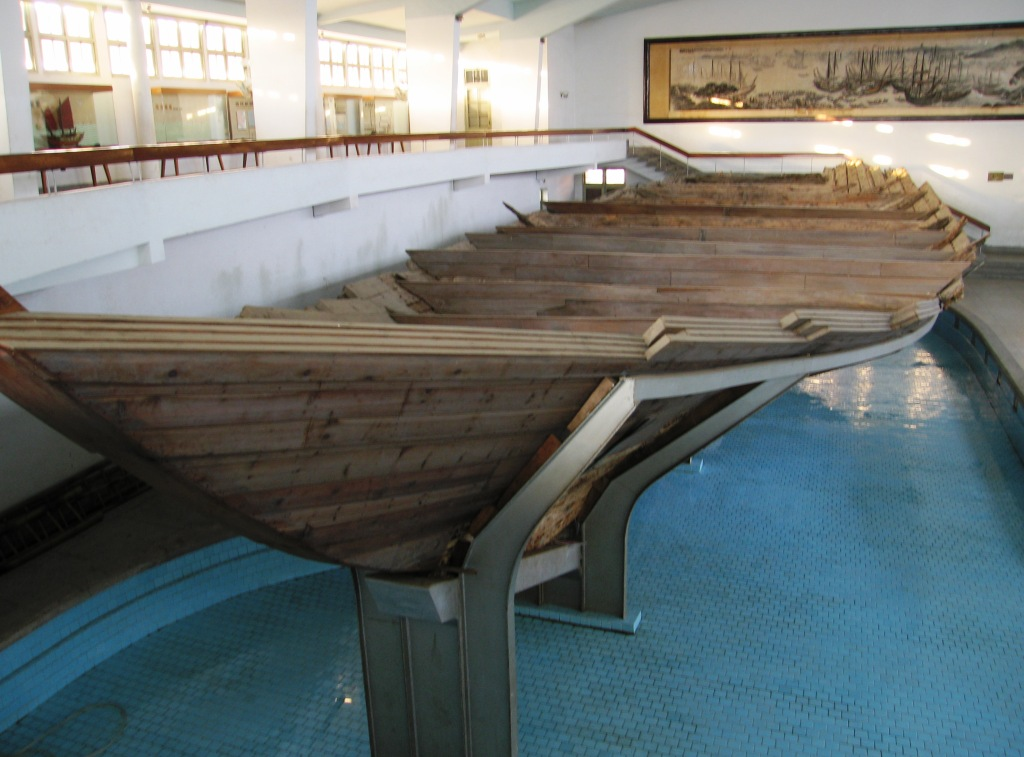
A Song era junk ship, 13th century; Chinese ships of the Song period featured hulls with watertight compartments.

The ships which sail the southern sea and south of it are like houses. When their sails are spread they are like great clouds in the sky. Their rudders are several tens of feet long. A single ship carries several hundred men, and has in the stores a year's supply of grain. Pigs are fed and wine fermented on board. There is no account of dead or living, no going back to the mainland when once the people have set forth upon the caerulean sea. At daybreak, when the gong sounds aboard the ship, the animals can drink their fill, and crew and passengers alike forget all dangers. To those on board everything is hidden and lost in space, mountains, landmarks, and the countries of foreigners. The shipmaster may say 'To make such and such a country, with a favourable wind, in so many days, we should sight such and such a mountain, (then) the ship must steer in such and such a direction'. But suddenly the wind may fall, and may not be strong enough to allow of the sighting of the mountain on the given day; in such a case, bearings may have to be changed. And the ship (on the other hand) may be carried far beyond (the landmark) and may lose its bearings. A gale may spring up, the ship may be blown hither and thither, it may meet with shoals or be driven upon hidden rocks, then it may be broken to the very roofs (of its deckhouses). A great ship with heavy cargo has nothing to fear from the high seas, but rather in shallow water it will come to grief.

The later Muslim Moroccan Berber traveler Ibn Battuta (1304–1377) wrote in greater detail about Chinese sailing vessels than Zhou Qufei. He noted that in and around the seas of China, only the distinct Chinese junks were used to sail the waters. He noted that the largest type of Chinese ships boasted a total of twelve sailing masts, while the smaller ones had three. On Chinese ships and their crews, Ibn Battuta stated:

The sails of these vessels are made of strips of bamboo, woven into the form of matting. The sailors never lower them (while sailing, but simply) change the direction of them according to whether the wind is blowing from one side or the other. When the ships cast anchor, the sails are left standing in the wind. Each of these ships is worked by 1,000 men, 600 sailors and 400 marines, among whom there are archers and crossbowmen furnished with shields, and men who throw (pots of) naptha. Each great vessel is followed by three others, a 'nisfi', a 'thoulthi' and a 'roubi' (f endnote: a pinnace, a small boat fitted with a rudder, and a rowing boat). These vessels are nowhere made except in the city of Zayton (Quanzhou) in China, or at Sin-Kilan, which is the same as Sin al-Sin (Guangzhou).

Ibn Battuta then went on describing the means of their construction, and accurate depictions of separate bulkhead compartments in the hulls of the ships:

This is the manner in which they are made; two (parallel) walls of very thick wooden (planking) are raised, and across the space between them are placed very thick planks (the bulkheads) secured longitudinally and transversely by means of large nails, each three ells in length. When these walls have thus been built, the lower deck is fitted in, and the ship is launched before the upper works are finished. The pieces of wood, and those parts of the hull, near the water(-line) serve for the crew to wash and to accomplish their natural necessities. On the sides of these pieces of wood also the oars are found; they are as big as masts, and are worked by 10 or 15 men (each), who row standing up.

Although Ibn Battuta had mentioned the size of the sailing crew, he described the sizes of the vessels further, as well as the lavish merchant cabins on board:

The vessels have four decks, upon which there are cabins and saloons for merchants. Several of these 'mysria' contain cupboards and other conveniences; they have doors which can be locked, and keys for their occupiers. (The merchants) take with them their wives and concubines. It often happens that a man can be in his cabin without others on board realizing it, and they do not see him until the vessel has arrived in some port. The sailors also have their children in such cabins; and (in some parts of the ship) they sew garden herbs, vegetables, and ginger in wooden tubs. The Commander of such a vessel is a great Emir; when he lands, the archers and the Ethiops (i.e. black slaves, yet in China these men-at-arms would have most likely been Malays) march before him bearing javelins and swords, with drums beating and trumpets blowing. When he arrives at the guesthouse where he is to stay, they set up their lances on each side of the gate, and mount guard throughout his visit.

=== Paddle-wheel ships ===
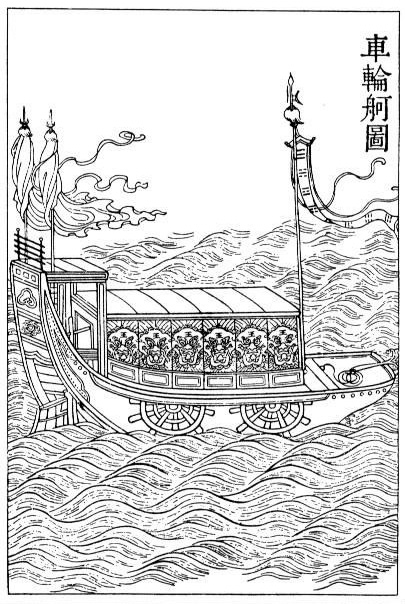
Paddle-wheel ship, 1726

During the Song dynasty there was also great amount of attention given to the building of efficient automotive vessels known as paddle wheel craft. The latter had been known in China perhaps since the 5th century, and certainly by the Tang dynasty in 784 with the successful paddle wheel warship design of Li Gao. In 1134, the Deputy Transport Commissioner of Zhejiang, Wu Ge, had paddle wheel warships constructed with a total of nine wheels and others with thirteen wheels. However, there were paddle wheel ships in the Song that were so large that 12 wheels were featured on each side of the vessel. In 1135 the famous general Yue Fei (1103–1142) ambushed a force of rebels under Yang Yao, entangling their paddle wheel craft by filling a lake with floating weeds and rotting logs, thus allowing them to board their ships and gain a strategic victory. In 1161, gunpowder bombs and paddle wheel crafts were used effectively by the Song Chinese at the Battle of Tangdao and the Battle of Caishi along the Yangtze River against the Jurchen Jin dynasty during the Jin–Song Wars. The Jurchen invasion, led by Wanyan Liang (the Prince of Hailing), failed to conquer the Southern Song.

In 1183, the Nanjing naval commander Chen Tang was given a reward for constructing ninety paddle wheel craft and other warships. In 1176, Emperor Xiaozong of Song (r. 1162–1189) issued an imperial order to the Nanjing official Guo Gang (who desired to convert damaged paddle wheel craft into junk ships and galleys) not to limit the number of paddle wheel craft in the navy's dockyards, since he had high esteem for the fast assault craft that won the Chinese victory at Caishi. However, paddle wheel craft found other uses besides effective assaults in warfare. The Arab or Persian Commissioner of Merchant Shipping for Quanzhou, the Muslim Pu Shougeng (who served from 1250 to 1275) noted that paddle wheel ships were also used by the Chinese as tugboats for towing.

== Metallurgy ==
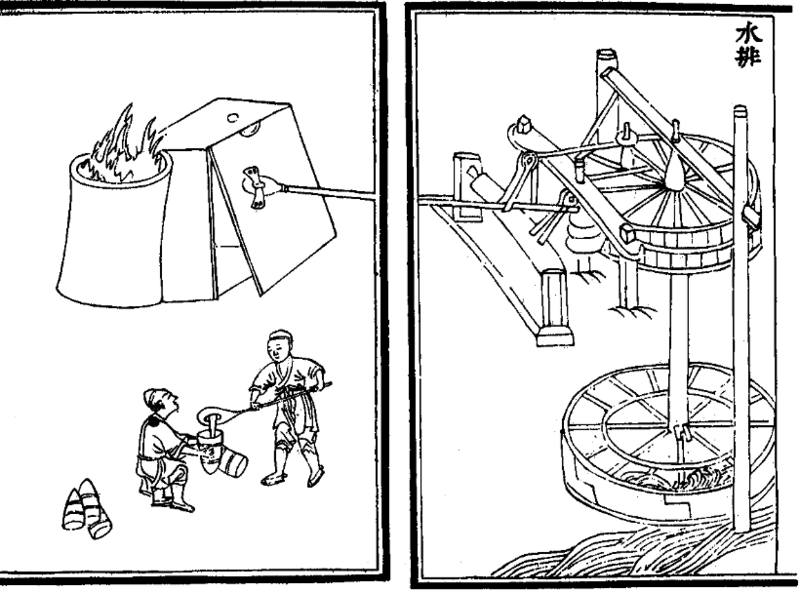
An illustration of blast furnace bellows operated by waterwheels, from the Nong Shu, by Wang Zhen, 1313, during the Yuan dynasty.

The art of metallurgy during the Song dynasty built upon the efforts of earlier Chinese dynasties, while new methods were incorporated. The Chinese of the ancient Han dynasty (202 BCE–220 CE) figured out how to create steel by smelting together the carbon intermediary of wrought iron and cast iron by the 1st century BCE. However, there were two new Chinese innovations of the Song dynasty to create steel during the 11th century. This was the "berganesque" method that produced inferior, inhomogeneous steel, while the other was a precursor to the modern Bessemer process that utilized partial decarbonization via repeated forging under a cold blast.

The per capita iron output rose sixfold between 806 and 1078, and by 1078 Song China was producing 127,000,000 kg (125,000 long tons; 127,000 t) in weight of iron per year. The historian Donald B. Wagner points out that this estimate was based upon the total number of government tax receipts on iron from the various iron-producing prefectures in the empire. In the smelting process of using huge bellows driven by hydraulics (i.e. large waterwheels), massive amounts of charcoal were used in the production process, leading to a wide range of deforestation in northern China. However, by the end of the 11th century the Chinese discovered that using bituminous coke could replace the role of charcoal, hence many acres of forested land and prime timber in northern China were spared by the steel and iron industry with this switch of resources to coal. This massive increase in output of the iron and steel industry in China was the result of the Song dynasty's needs for military expansion, private commercial demands for metal products such as cooking utensils found in the market and a wide variety of agricultural tools, and by new canals linking major centers of iron and steel production to the capital city's bustling market. The many uses for manufactured iron products in the Song period included iron for weapons, implements, coins, architectural elements, musical bells, artistic statues, and components for machinery such as the hydraulic-powered trip hammer, which had been known since the 1st century BCE during the ancient Han dynasty, and used extensively during the Song.

Due to the enormous amount of production, the economic historian Robert Hartwell noted that Chinese iron and coal production in the following 12th century was equal to if not greater than England's iron and coal production in the early phase of the Industrial Revolution during the late 18th century. However, the Chinese of the Song period did not harness the energy potential of coal in ways that would generate power mechanically, as in the later Industrial Revolution that would originate in the West. There were certain administrative prefectures during the Song era where the Chinese iron industry was mostly concentrated. For example, the poet and statesman Su Shi wrote a memorial to the throne in 1078 that specified 36 ironwork smelters, each employing a work force of several hundred people, in the Liguo Industrial Prefecture (under his governance while he administered Xuzhou).

== Wind power ==
The effect of wind power was appreciated in China long before the introduction of the windmill during the Song period. It is uncertain when the ancient Chinese used their very first inflatable bellows as wind-blowing machines for kilns and furnaces. They existed perhaps as far back as the Shang dynasty (1600–1050 BCE), due to the intricate bronze casting technology of the period. They were certainly used since the advent of the blast furnace in China from the 6th century BCE onwards, since cast-iron farm tools and weapons were widespread by the 5th century BCE. In 31, the Han dynasty governmental prefect and engineer Du Shi (d. 38) employed the use of horizontal waterwheels and a complex mechanical gear system to operate the large bellows that heated the blast furnace in smelting cast iron. Bellows continued in use for purposes of metallurgy, but other sources of wind power were discovered and harnessed. The Han dynasty artisan Ding Huan (fl. 180) not only pioneered the invention of the cardan suspension, but also the rotary fan, which could be used as a simple air conditioner. This employed seven wheels, each about 3 m (10 ft) in diameter and manually powered, but by the Tang dynasty (618–907) palaces featured water-powered rotary fans for air conditioning, and in the Song dynasty, states Needham, "the refrigerant effects of artificial draught seem to have been appreciated ever more widely." There was also an intricate Chinese rotary fan winnowing machine depicted in Wang Zhen's agricultural treatise of the Nong Shu of 1313 (although the earliest depiction of a winnowing machine was from a Han dynasty tomb model dated from the 2nd century BCE to the 2nd century). After these innovations, the windmill was finally introduced to China in the early 13th century via the Jin dynasty in northern China, during the late Song dynasty.

The Persian scholar Ali ibn Sahl Rabban al-Tabari wrote c. 850 that the earlier Caliph Umar ibn al-Khattab was murdered in 644 by the technician Abu Lu'lu'a, who claimed to construct mills driven by the power of wind. More reliable than this account were the windmills of the Banu Musa brothers (850 to 870), while there are also several authors confirming the windmills of Sistan (Iran), written of by Abu Ishaq al-Istakhri and Abu al-Qasim ibn Hauqal. The northern Chinese under the rule of the Jurchen Jin dynasty became acquainted with the windmills of the Islamic world in the early 13th century. This is seen in an account of the Shu Zhai Lao Xue Cong Tan (Collected Talks of the Learned Old Man of the Shu Studio), written by Sheng Ruozi. It read:

In the collection of the private works of the 'Placid Retired Scholar' (Zhan Ran Ju Shi), there are ten poems on Hechong Fu. One of these describes the scenery of that place […] and says that 'the stored wheat is milled by the rushing wind and the rice is pounded fresh by hanging pestles. The westerners (i.e. Turks) there use windmills (feng mo) just as the people of the south (i.e. the Southern Song) use watermills (shui mo). And when they pound they have the pestles hanging vertically'.

Here Sheng Ruozi quotes a written selection about windmills from the 'Placid Retired Scholar', who is actually Yelü Chucai (1190–1244), a prominent Jin and Yuan statesman (after the Jin fell in 1234 to the Mongols). The passage refers to Yelü's journey to Turkestan (modern Xinjiang) in 1219, and Hechong Fu is actually Samarkand (in modern Uzbekistan). Afterwards, the Chinese applied the 'fore-and-aft' sail riggings of typical Chinese junk ships to horizontal windmills. These windmills were used to operate the square-pallet chain pumps used in Chinese irrigation since the ancient Han dynasty. Windmills of this nature were still in use during modern times in Tianjin and along the Yangtze River. The first European to view Chinese windmills was Jan Nieuhoff, who spotted them in Jiangsu while traveling along the Grand Canal in 1656, as part of the Dutch embassy to Beijing. The first European windmills written of were those of Dean Herbert of East Anglia in 1191, who competed with the mills of the Abbey of Bury St Edmunds.

After the windmill, wind power applications in other devices and even vehicles were found in China. There was the 'sailing carriage' that appeared by at least the Ming dynasty in the 16th century (although it could have been known beforehand). European travelers to China in the late 16th century were surprised to find large single-wheel passenger and cargo wheelbarrows not only pulled by mule or horse, but also mounted with ship-like masts and sails to help push them along by the wind.

== Archaeology ==
During the early half of the Song dynasty (960–1279), the study of archaeology developed out of the antiquarian interests of the educated gentry and their desire to revive the use of ancient vessels in state rituals and ceremonies. This and the belief that ancient vessels were products of 'sages' and not common people was criticized by Shen Kuo, who discussed metallurgy, optics, astronomy, geometry, and ancient music measures in addition to archeology. His contemporary Ouyang Xiu (1007–1072) compiled an analytical catalogue of ancient rubbings on stone and bronze. In accordance with the beliefs of the later Leopold von Ranke (1795–1886), some Song gentry—such as Zhao Mingcheng (1081–1129)—valued archaeological evidence over historical works written after the fact, finding written records unreliable when they failed to match with the archaeological discoveries. Hong Mai (1123–1202) used ancient Han dynasty era vessels to debunk what he found to be fallacious descriptions of Han vessels in the Bogutu archaeological catalogue compiled during the latter half of Huizong's reign (1100–1125).

== Geology and climatology ==
Shen Kuo also made hypotheses in regards to geology and climatology in his Dream Pool Essays of 1088. Shen believed that land was reshaped over time due to perpetual erosion, uplift, and deposition of silt, and cited his observance of horizontal strata of fossils embedded in a cliffside in the Taihang Mountains as evidence that the area was once the location of an ancient seashore that had shifted hundreds of miles east over an enormous span of time. Shen also wrote that since petrified bamboos were found underground in a dry northern climate zone where they had never been known to grow, climates naturally shifted geographically over time.

== Forensics ==
Early concepts in forensic science were pioneered in China during the Song dynasty. When there was a suspected murder, sheriffs would visit the scene to determine if the death was caused naturally, by accident, or by foul play. If the latter determination was made a prefectural official would investigate, draw up an inquest that included sketches of potential injuries on the deceased body, and have it signed by witnesses for presentation in a court of law. Details of these efforts are preserved in written accounts such as the Collected Cases of Injustice Rectified by the judge and physician Song Ci (1186–1249), whose work documents various types of death (strangulation, drowning, poison, blows, etc.) and how physical examinations in autopsies can distinguish between murder, suicide, or accident. Song provided information on first aid for victims close to death, including the use of artificial respiration for those who drowned. In an early case of forensic entomology, a villager was hacked to death with a sickle, so the local magistrate assembled villagers in a town square to lay down their sickles to observe which one would attract blow flies to unseen remnants of the victim's blood; when it became apparent which sickle was used as the murder weapon, the confessing murderer was arrested.

== Other ==
Developments in atmospheric and technical optics occurred during the Song period, including pinhole imaging and mathematical generalisation of optics laws.

== See also ==
- History of science and technology in China
- List of Chinese discoveries
- List of Chinese inventions
- List of inventions and discoveries of Neolithic China
- Science and technology of the Han dynasty
- Science and technology of the Tang dynasty
- Science and technology of the Yuan dynasty
