= Iron Pagoda =

Historic building in Henan, PRC

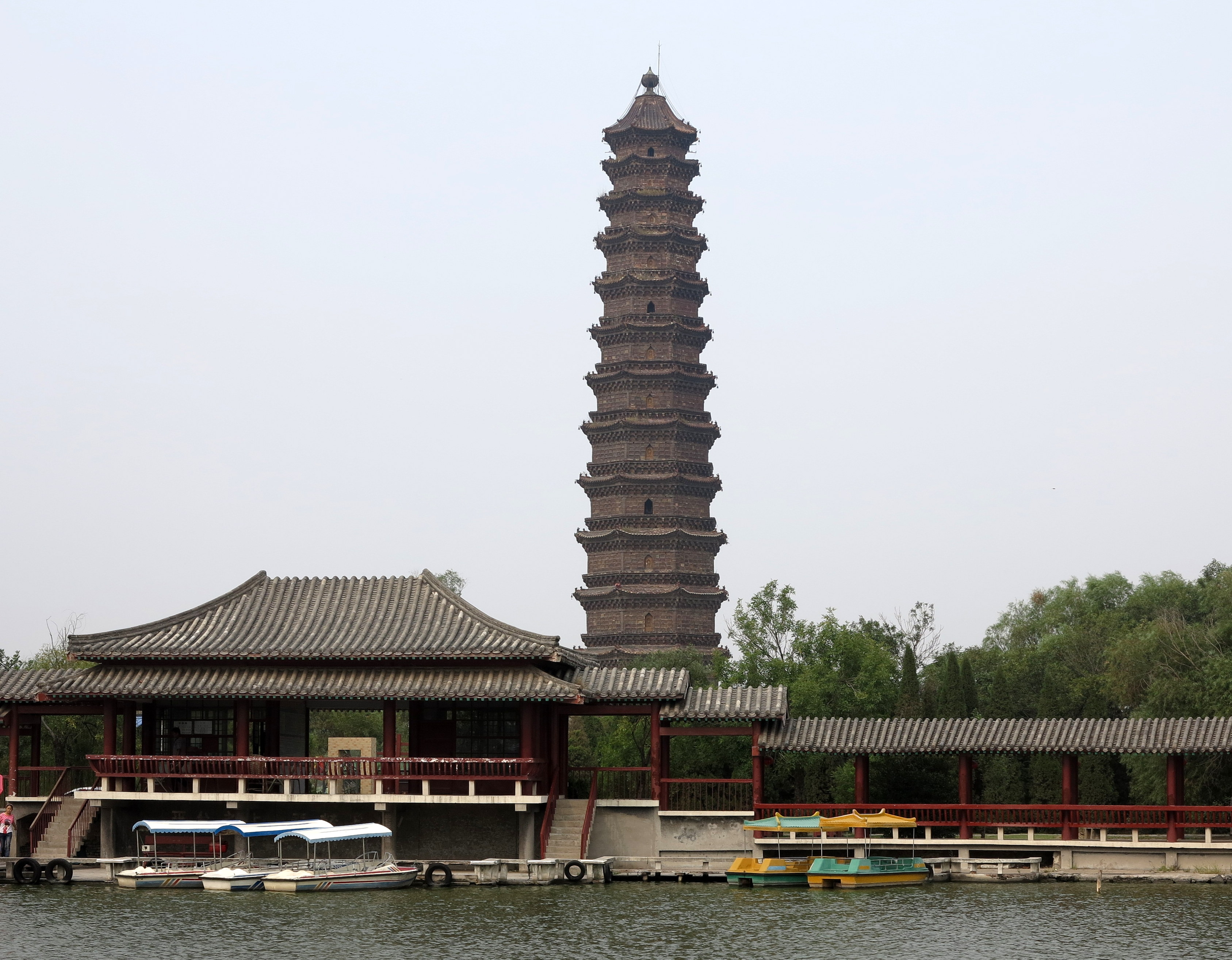
- The Iron Pagoda of Kaifeng, China, built in 1049

- Location in Henan

Religion
- Affiliation: Han Chinese Buddhism

Location
- Country: Kaifeng City, Henan province
- Coordinates: 34°49′00″N 114°21′54″E

Architecture
- Completed: 17 June 1049; 977 years ago

The Iron Pagoda (Chinese: 鐵塔) of Youguo Temple (佑國寺), Kaifeng City, Henan province, is a Chinese pagoda built in 1049. Unlike the Yu Quan pagoda of Dangyang, the Iron pagoda is so-named not because it is made of iron, but because its color resembles that of iron. It is a brick pagoda tower built on the location of a previous wooden one that had been burnt down by lightning fire in 1044. Along with the Liuhe, Lingxiao, Liaodi, Pizhi, and Beisi pagodas, it is seen as a masterpiece of Song dynasty architecture. The Iron Pagoda is often confused with the Yu Quan Pagoda of Dangyang, which is the pagoda that is almost entirely made out of cast iron.

== Architecture ==
This octagonal-base structure stands at a current height of 56.88 meters (186.56 feet), with a total of 13 stories. It is a solid-core brick tower with an inner spiral stone staircase and outside openings to allow light and air flow. The architectural style features densely positioned, articulated dougong in the eaves (miyan) and multiple stories (louge). The exterior features more than fifty different varieties of glazed brick and 1,600 intricate and richly detailed carvings, including those of standing and sitting Buddha, standing monks, singers and flying dancers, flowers, lions, dragons and other legendary beasts as well as many fine engravings. Under the eaves are 104 bells that ring in the wind. The foundation rests in the silt of the Yellow River. Inside the Iron Pagoda are frescos of the classical Chinese tales, such as The Journey to the West.

== History ==
In the Northern Song (960–1127) dynasty's capital city of Kaifeng, the famous architect Yu Hao built a magnificent wooden pagoda as part of Youguo Temple (between 965 and 995 CE) that was considered by many of his contemporaries to be a marvel of art. Unfortunately, the widely admired structure burned down in 1044 after a lightning strike. Under the order of Emperor Renzong (1022–1063), a new pagoda was built in its place by 1049. The new tower was built of nonflammable brick and stone and was dubbed the 'Iron Pagoda' due to its iron-grey color when viewed from afar (its bricks are in fact glazed red, brown, blue, and green). In 1847, the Yellow River overflowed its banks, and the Youguo Temple collapsed, but the Iron Pagoda survived. Historically, the pagoda has experienced 38 earthquakes, six floods, and many other disasters, but it remains intact after almost 1,000 years.

In 1994, the Iron Pagoda was featured on a two-yuan Chinese postage stamp.

== Gallery ==
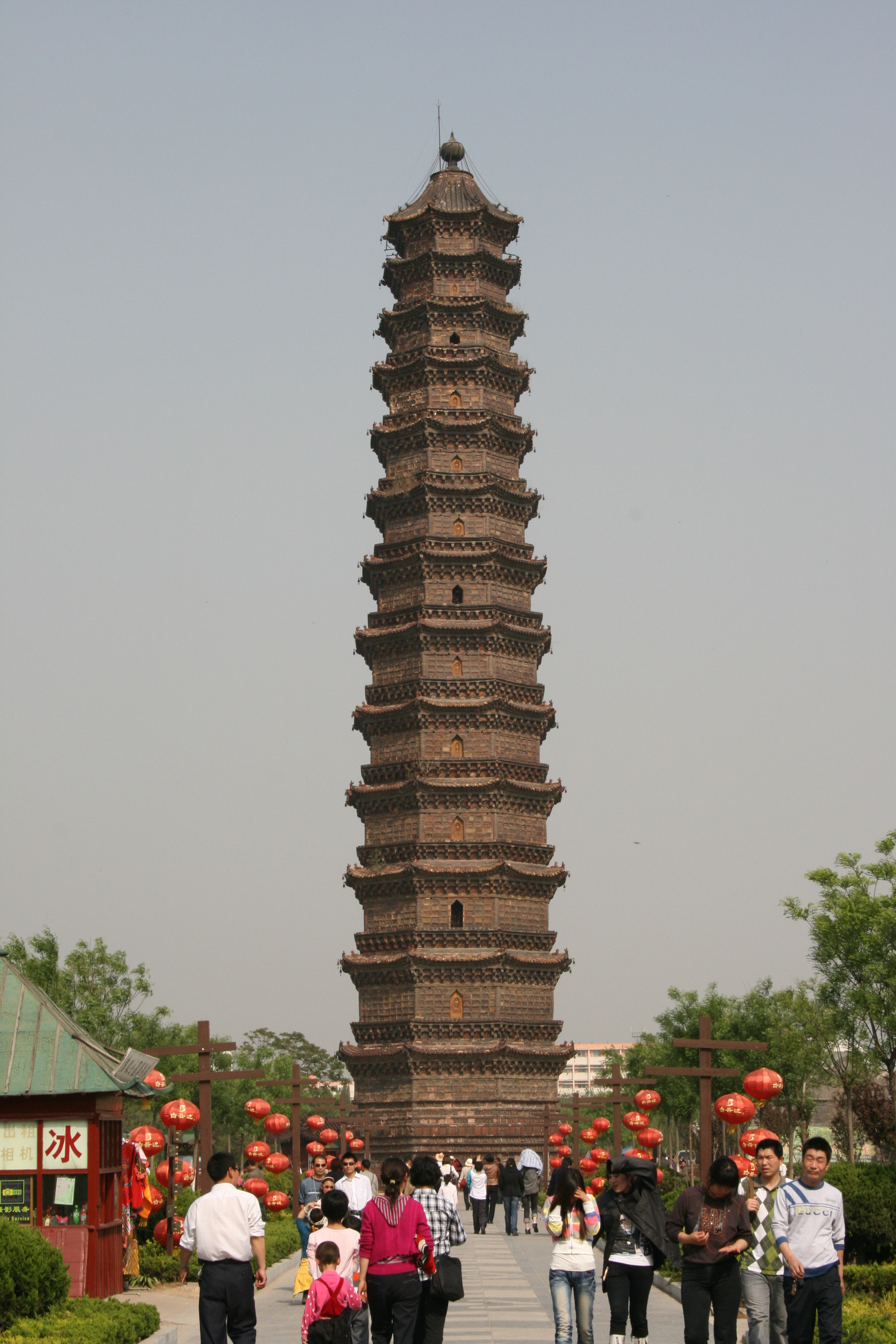

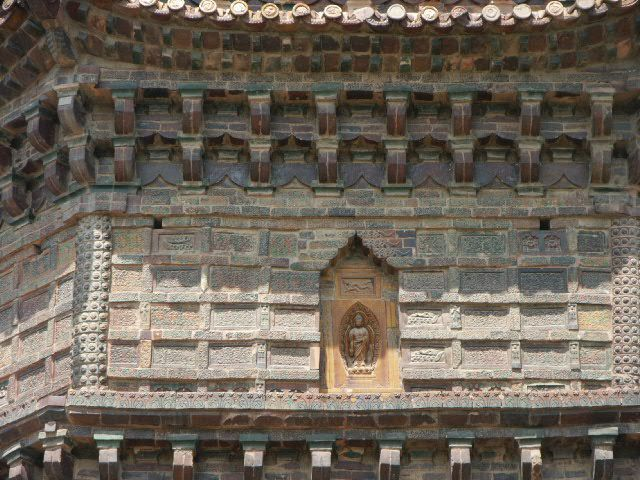

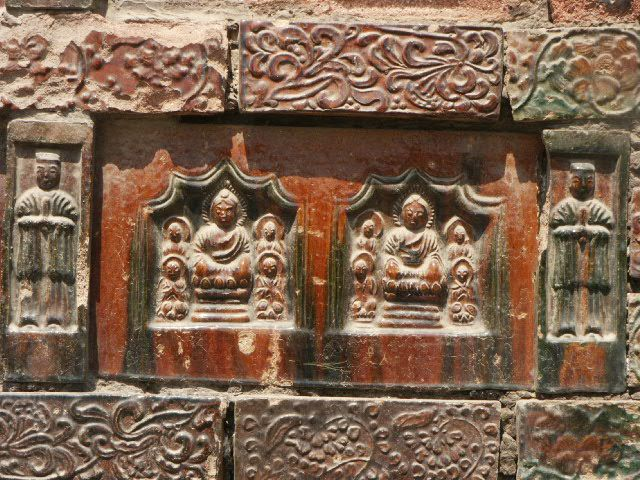
detail

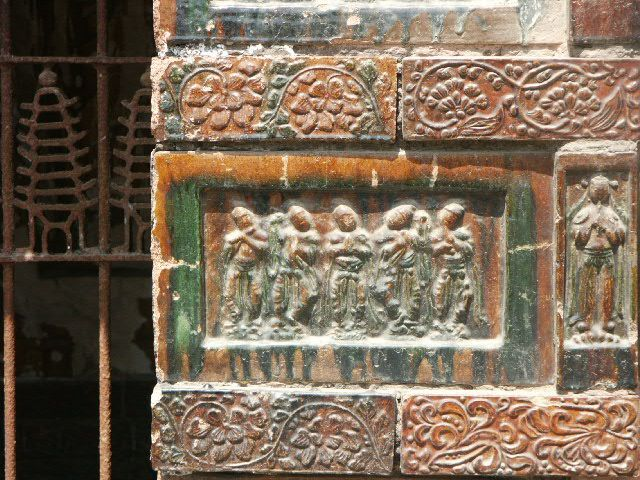
detail

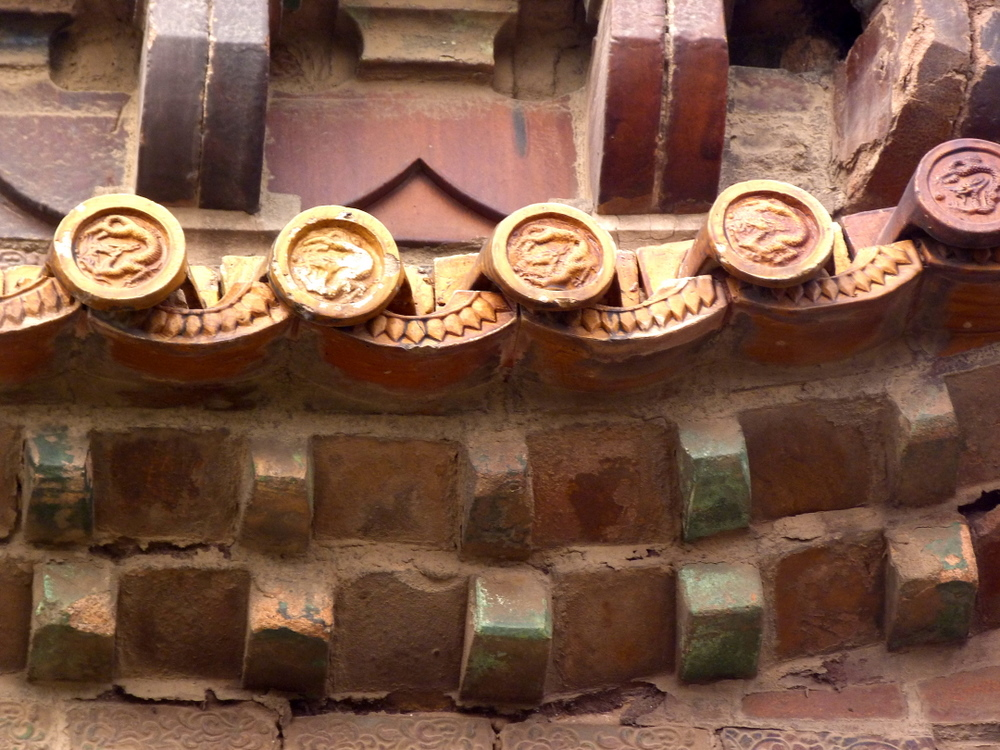
glazed tiles of Iron Pagoda

== See also ==
- Architecture of the Song dynasty
