= Yu Hao =

Chinese architect, structural engineer, and writer

Yu Hao (Chinese: 喻皓, fl. 970) was a Chinese architect, structural engineer, and writer during the Song Dynasty.

== Legacy ==
Yu Hao was given the title of Master-Carpenter (Du Liao Jiang) for his architectural skill. He wrote the Mu Jing (木經; Timberwork Manual) when he was active sometime between 965 and 995, considered an important piece of classical Chinese architectural literature, and although it no longer survives, Shen Kuo quoted from it. In 989, his architectural design and structural engineering work culminated in the construction of the Kai-Bao Pagoda, a wooden Chinese pagoda of medieval Kaifeng (the Northern Song's capital city). The pagoda was lost in a 1040 lightning conflagration, while the now-famous Iron Pagoda of Kaifeng was rebuilt on the same spot in 1049, constructed out of brick and stone to resist arson and lightning fires.

== Timberwork Manual ==
Writing a century later (c. 1088), the polymath scientist and statesman Shen Kuo (1031–1095) praised the architectural writings of Yu Hao. Below are two passages from Shen's book Meng Xi Bi Tan (Dream Pool Essays), outlining the basics contained in Yu's 10th-century work on early Song-era architecture.

In the first quote, Shen describes a scene in which Yu gives advice to another artisan architect about slanting struts for diagonal wind bracing (Wade-Giles spelling):

When Mr. Chhien (Wei-Yen) was Governor of the two Chekiang provinces, he authorized the building of a wooden pagoda at the Fan-Thien Ssu (Brahma-Heaven Temple) in Hangchow with a design of twice three stories. While it was under construction General Chien went up to the top and was worried because it swayed a little. But the master-builder explained that as the tiles had not yet been put on, the upper part was still rather light, hence the effect. So then they put on all the tiles, but the sway continued as before. Being at a loss what to do, he privately sent his wife to see the wife of Yu Hao with a present of golden hair pins, and enquire about the cause of the motion. (Yu) Hao laughed and said: 'That's easy, just fit in struts (pan) to settle the work, fixed with (iron) nails, and it will not move anymore.' The Master-Builder followed his advice, and the tower stood quite firm. This is because the nailed struts filled in and bound together (all the members) up and down so that the six planes (above and below, front and back, left and right) were mutually linked like the cage of the thorax. Although people might walk on the struts, the six planes grasped and supported each other, so naturally, there could be no more motion. Everybody acknowledged the expertise thus shown.

In this next quote, Shen describes the dimensions and types of architecture outlined in Yu Hao's book (Wade-Giles spelling):

Methods of building construction are described in the Timberwork Manual, which, some say, was written by Yu. (According to that book), buildings have three basic units of proportion (fen), what is above the cross-beams follows the Upperwork Unit, what is above the ground floor follows the Middlework Unit, and everything below that (platforms, foundations, paving, etc.) follows the Lowerwork Unit. The length of the cross-beams will naturally govern the lengths of the uppermost cross-beams as well as the rafters, etc. Thus for a (main) cross-beam of (8 ft.) length, an uppermost cross-beam of (3.5 ft.) length will be needed. (The proportions are maintained) in larger and smaller halls. This (2/28) is the Upperwork Unit. Similarly, the dimensions of the foundations must match the dimensions of the columns to be used, as also those of the (side-) rafters, etc. For example, a column (11 ft.) high will need a platform (4.5 ft.) high. So also for all the other components, corbelled brackets (kung), projecting rafters (tshui), other rafters (chueh), all have their fixed proportions. All these follow the Middlework Unit (2/24). Now below of ramps (and steps) there are three kinds, steep, easy-going, and intermediate. In places these gradients are based upon a unit derived from the imperial litters. Steep ramps (chun tao) are ramps for ascending which the leading and trailing bearers have to extend their arms fully down and up respectively (ratio 3/35). Easy-going ramps (man tao) are those for which the leaders use elbow length and the trailers shoulder height (ratio 1/38); intermediate ones (phing tao) are negotiated by the leaders with downstretched arms and trailers at shoulder height (ratio 2/18). These are the Lowerwork Units. The book (of Yu Hao) had three chapters. But builders (thu mu chih kung) in recent years have become much more precise and skillful (yen shan) than formerly. Thus for some time past the old Timberwork Manual has fallen out of use. But (unfortunately) there is hardly anybody capable of writing a new one. To do that would be a masterpiece in itself!

== See also ==
- Architecture of Song Dynasty
- Chinese architecture
- List of architects
