= Science and technology of the Yuan dynasty =

During the Yuan dynasty (1271–1368) of China, many scientific and technological advancements were made in areas such as mathematics, medicine, printing technology, and gunpowder warfare.

== Mathematics ==
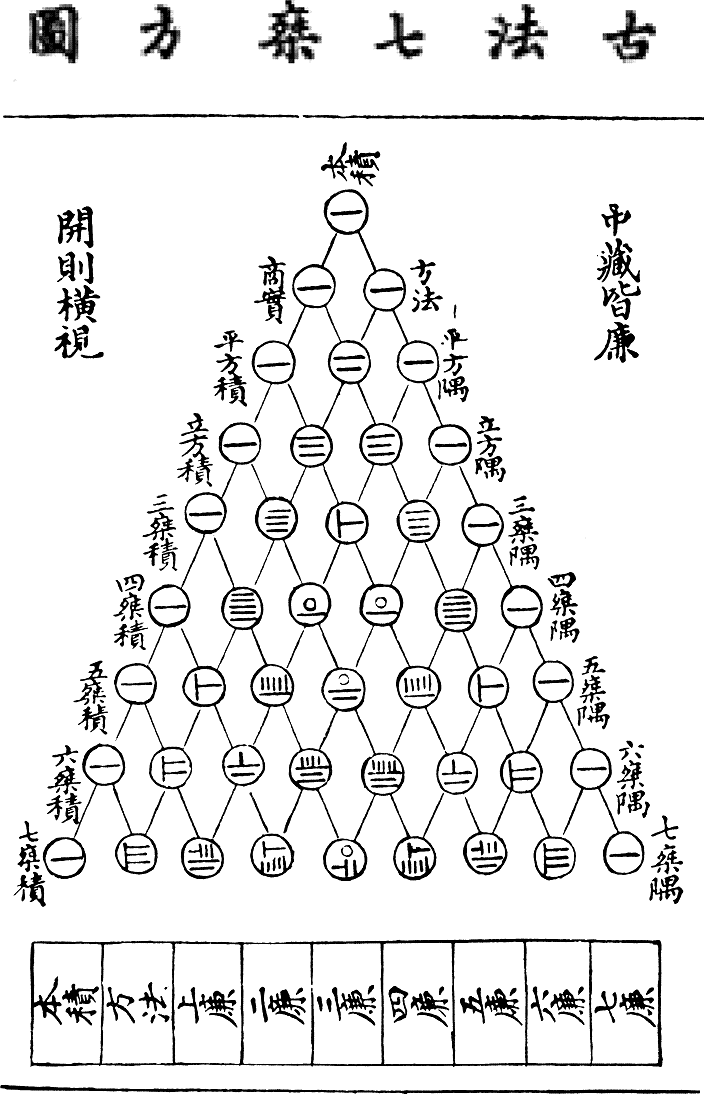
A diagram of Pascal's triangle in Zhu Shijie's Jade Mirror of the Four Unknowns, written in 1303

Advances in polynomial algebra were made by mathematicians during the Yuan Dynasty. The mathematician Zhu Shijie (1249–1314) solved simultaneous equations with up to four unknowns using a rectangular array of coefficients, equivalent to modern matrices. Zhu used a method of elimination to reduce the simultaneous equations to a single equation with only one unknown. His method is described in the Jade Mirror of the Four Unknowns, written in 1303. The opening pages contain a diagram of Pascal's triangle. The summation of a finite arithmetic series is also covered in the book.

Guo Shoujing applied mathematics to the construction of calendars. He was one of the first mathematicians in China to work on spherical trigonometry. Gou derived a cubic interpolation formula for his astronomical calculations. His calendar, the Shoushi Li (授時暦) or Calendar for Fixing the Seasons, was disseminated in 1281 as the official calendar of the Yuan dynasty. The calendar may have been influenced solely by the work of Song dynasty astronomer Shen Kuo or possibly by the work of Arab astronomers. There are no explicit signs of Muslim influences in the Shoushi calendar, but Yuan emperors were known to be interested in Muslim calendars. Mathematical knowledge from the Middle East was introduced to China, and Muslim astronomers brought Arabic numerals to China in the 13th century.

== Medicine ==
The physicians of the Yuan imperial court came from diverse cultures. Healers were divided into non-Mongol physicians called otachi and traditional Mongol shamans. The Mongols characterized otachi doctors by their use of herbal remedies, which was distinguished from the spiritual cures of Mongol shamanism. Physicians received official support from the Yuan government and were given special legal privileges. Kublai (Emperor Shizu) created the Imperial Academy of Medicine to manage medical treatises and the education of new doctors. Confucian scholars were attracted to the medical profession because it ensured a high income and medical ethics were compatible with Confucian virtues.

The Chinese medical tradition of the Yuan dynasty consisted of "Four Great Schools" that were inherited from the Jin dynasty. All four schools were based on the same intellectual foundation, but advocated different theoretical approaches toward medicine. Under the Mongols, the practice of Chinese medicine spread to other parts of the empire. Ethnic Han physicians were brought along military campaigns by the Mongols as they expanded towards the west. Chinese medical techniques such as acupuncture, moxibustion, pulse diagnosis, and various herbal drugs and elixirs were transmitted westward to the Middle East and the rest of the empire. Several medical advances were made in the Yuan period. The physician Wei Yilin (1277–1347) invented a suspension method for reducing dislocated joints, which he performed using anesthetics. The Mongol physician Hu Sihui described the importance of a healthy diet in a 1330 medical treatise.

Western medicine was also practiced in China by the Nestorian Christians of the Yuan court, where it was sometimes labeled as huihui or Muslim medicine. The Nestorian physician Jesus the Interpreter founded the Office of Western Medicine in 1263 during the reign of Kublai. Huihui doctors staffed at two imperial hospitals were responsible for treating the imperial family and members of the court. Chinese physicians opposed Western medicine because its humoral system contradicted the yin-yang and wuxing philosophy underlying traditional Chinese medicine. No Chinese translation of Western medical works is known, but it is possible that the Chinese had access to Avicenna's The Canon of Medicine.

== Printing and publishing ==
Yuan dynasty banknote with its printing plate, 1287.

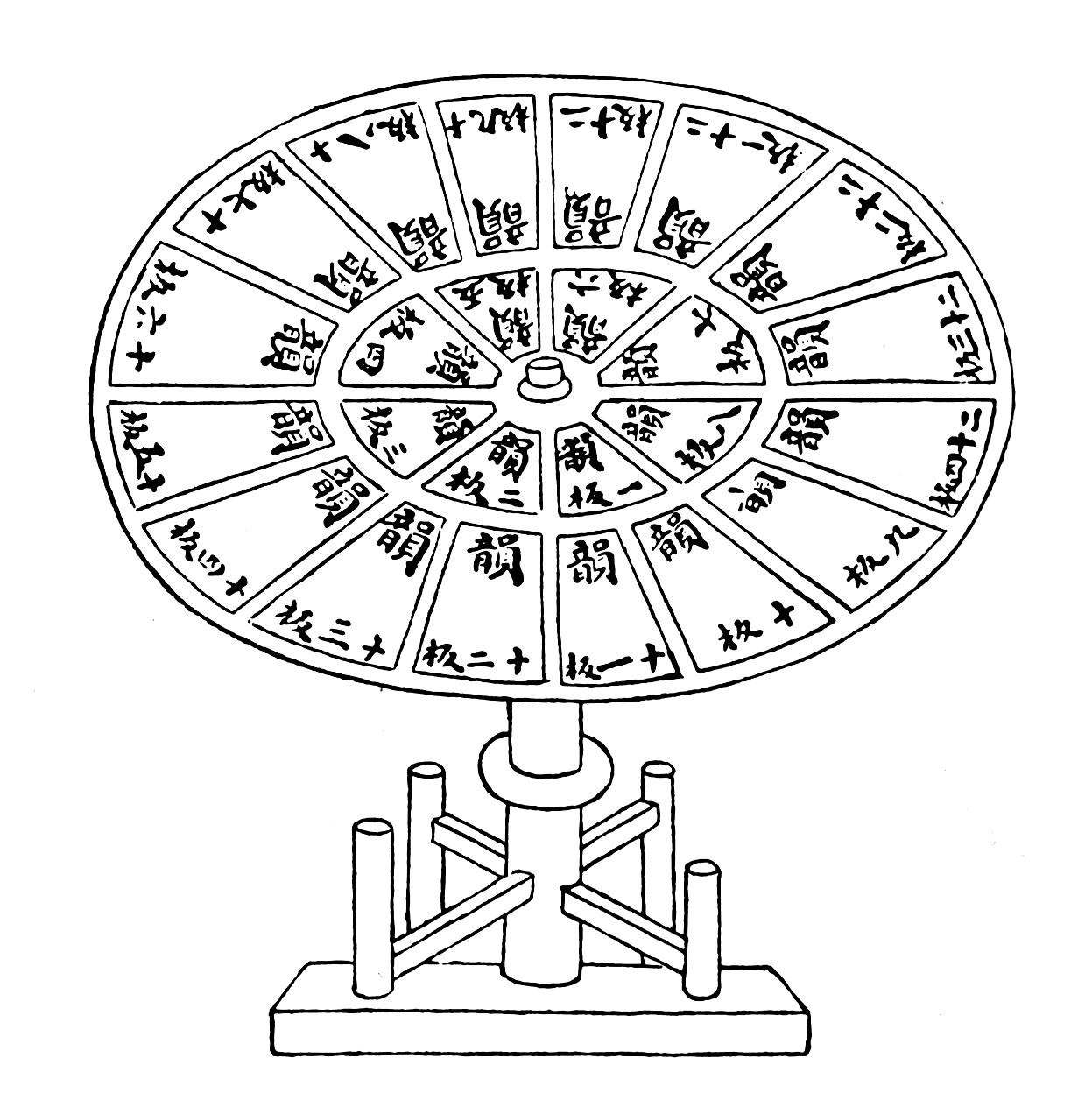
A revolving typecase with individual movable type characters from Wang Zhen's Nong Shu, published in 1313

Yuan rulers patronized the printing industry. Han printing technology was transferred to the Mongols through Uighur and Tibetan intermediaries. Some Yuan documents such as Wang Zhen's Nong Shu were printed with earthenware movable type, a technology invented in the 12th century. However, most published works were still produced through traditional block printing techniques. The publication of a Taoist text inscribed with the name of Töregene Khatun, Ögedei's wife, is one of the first printed works sponsored by the Mongols. In 1273, the Yuan dynasty created the Imperial Library Directorate, a government-sponsored printing office. The Yuan government established centers for printing throughout China. Local schools and government agencies were funded to support the publishing of books.

Private printing businesses also flourished under the Yuan. They published a diverse range of works, and printed educational, literary, medical, religious, and historical texts. The volume of printed materials was vast. In 1312, 1,000 copies of a Buddhist text commented by Cosgi Odsir were printed just within Beijing. By 1328, annual sales of printed calendars and almanacs reached over three million in the Yuan dynasty.

One of the more notable applications of printing technology was the Jiaochao, the paper money of the Yuan. Jiaochao were made from the bark of mulberry trees. The Yuan government used woodblocks to print paper money, but switched to bronze plates in 1275. The Mongols experimented with establishing the Chinese-style paper monetary system in other Mongol-controlled territories outside of Yuan China. The Yuan minister Bolad was sent to Iran, where he explained Yuan paper money to the court of Gaykhatu of the Ilkhanate. The Il-khanate government issued paper money in 1294, but public distrust of the exotic new currency doomed the experiment.

Foreign observers took note of Yuan printing technology. Marco Polo documented the Yuan printing of paper money and almanac pamphlets called tacuini. The vizier Rashid-al-Din recognized that printing was a valuable technological breakthrough, and expressed regret that the Mongols experiment with printing paper money had failed in the Muslim world. Rashid-al-Din's view was not shared by other chroniclers in the Middle East, who were critical of the experiment's disruptive impact on the Il-khanate.
