= Diederichs (publisher) =

German book publisher

Diederichs Verlag
- Parent company: Random House
- Founded: September 14, 1896
- Founder: Eugen Diederichs
- Country of origin: Germany
- Headquarters location: Munich, Bavaria
- Key people: Thomas Rathnow
- Official website: www.randomhouse.de

Diederichs is a German book publisher based in Munich, Bavaria. Founded in 1896 by Eugen Diederichs, it profoundly shaped intellectual life at the beginning of the 20th century. After three generations as a family-owned enterprise, from 1988 the firm was owned by Hugendubel. Since 2008, it has been part of the Verlagsgruppe Random House.

== History ==
A bookseller by trade, Eugen Diederichs (1867–1930) made a trip to Italy after the death of his father. The travel journals published in his hometown of Naumburg (Saale) formed the basis of his publishing activities. In 1896, Diederichs founded his book publishing house. Initially based in Florence, Diederichs later moved with his publishing house to Leipzig, finally locating in Jena in 1904. Through Diederichs' achievements, the university town of Jena in Thuringia developed into a significant location in Germany for publishing.

The range included Classical and Romantic literary works, along with non-fiction publications. In addition to books such as those from Hans Christian Andersen, Henri Bergson, Maxim Gorky, Søren Kierkegaard, Leo N. Tolstoy and Anton Chekhov, several book series were published, such as "Monographien zur deutschen Kulturgeschichte" (Monographs on German Cultural History). Of special significance alongside the "Sammlung Thule" (Thule Collection) were "Märchen der Weltliteratur" (Fairy Tales of World Literature), the entire bibliography of which today encompasses 174 editions.

In the 1930s, Diederichs' sons, Niels and Peter, managed the publishing house. During the Nazi period, they adapted the portfolio to the intellectual guidelines of the regime. After the Second World War, the two men resumed operations in Düsseldorf and Cologne. From 1973 to 1988, the publishing house was headed up by Diederichs' grandson, Ulf. Due to economic difficulties, it was ultimately sold to Heinrich Hugendubel. Hugendubel sought to position the publisher "between tradition and innovation." In 1999, Diederichs became a brand within the Hugendubel publishing company and, as part of that group, was sold to business lawyer Monika Roell.

In 2008, the Verlagsgruppe Random House announced the takeover of the brands belonging to the Hugendubel publishing house, including Diederichs. The archive of the publisher and of the family came under the auspices of the Thuringian University and Regional Library. While "world cultures, fairy tales of world literature and world religions" were the publisher's main focus, the profile of Diederichs underwent myriad changes in the years that followed, and the range was gradually revamped.

== Portfolio ==
Today, Diederichs publishes biographies, novels, memoirs, modern fairy tales and poetry. Recent authors include Igal Avidan, Eva Padberg, and Botho Strauss. The current list of publications encompasses 90 books, including e-books under the "Diederichs Digital" label. Diederichs has also published a select number of audio books. Among the new releases are the licensed new edition of "Eine Stunde hinter Mitternacht" (One Hour After Midnight) by Hermann Hesse, first published in 1899 by Diederichs, and the German version of the fable, "The Dog, the Wolf and God" by Folco Terzani.
