= Science in the ancient world =

Science in the ancient world encompasses the earliest history of science from the protoscience of prehistory and ancient history to late antiquity. In ancient times, culture and knowledge were passed through oral tradition. The development of writing further enabled the preservation of knowledge and culture, allowing information to spread accurately.

The earliest scientific traditions of the ancient world developed in the Ancient Near East, with Ancient Egypt and Babylonia in Mesopotamia. Later traditions of science during classical antiquity were advanced in ancient Persia, Greece, Rome, India, China, and Mesoamerica. Aside from alchemy and astrology that waned in importance during the Age of Enlightenment, civilizations of the ancient world laid the roots of modern sciences.

== Ancient Near East and North East Africa ==
=== Mesopotamia ===
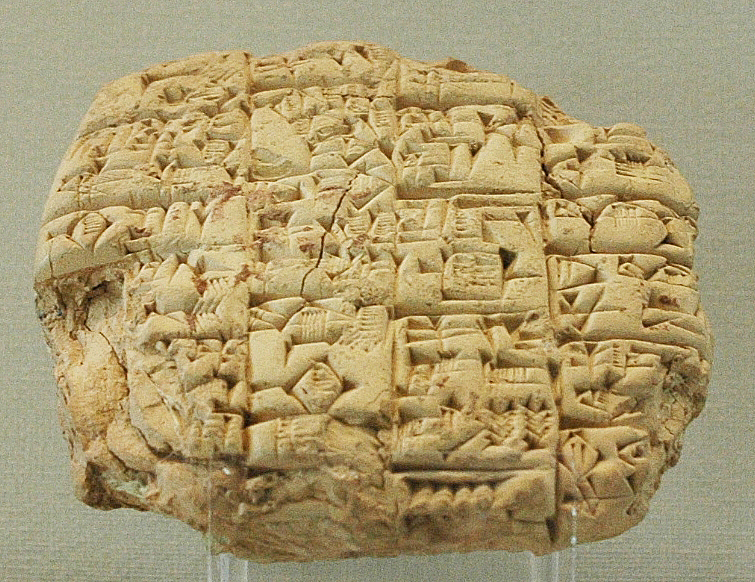
Mesopotamian clay tablet-letter from 2400 BC, Louvre (from King of Lagash, found at Girsu)

Around 3500 BC, in Sumer (now Iraq), the Mesopotamian people began preserving some observations of the cosmos with extremely thorough numerical data.

==== Mathematics ====
Pythagorean theorem has demonstrated evidence of ancient writing forms. It was recorded in the 18th century BC on the Mesopotamian cuneiform tablet known as Plimpton 322. The columns of numbers in the tablet generates several Pythagorean triples such as (3, 4, 5) and (5, 12, 13).

==== Astronomy ====
Babylonian astronomy was "the first and highly successful attempt at giving a refined mathematical description of astronomical phenomena." According to the historian Asger Aaboe, "all subsequent varieties of scientific astronomy, in the Hellenistic world, in India, in Islam, and in the West—if not indeed all subsequent endeavour in the exact sciences—depend upon Babylonian astronomy in decisive and fundamental ways".

Scribes recorded observations of the cosmos such as the motions of the stars, the planets, and the Moon on clay tablets. The cuneiform style of writing revealed that astronomers used mathematical calculations to observe the motions of the planets. Astronomical periods identified by Mesopotamian scientists remain widely used in Western calendars: the solar year and the lunar month. Using data, Mesopotamians developed arithmetical methods to compute the changing length of daylight during the year, and to predict the Lunar phases and planets along with eclipses of the Sun and Moon.

Only a few astronomers' names are known, such as Kidinnu, a Chaldean astronomer and mathematician. Kiddinu's value for the solar year is in use for modern calendars. Hipparchus used this data to calculate the axial precession of the Earth's axis. Fifteen hundred years after Kiddinu, Al-Battani used the collected data and improved Hipparchus' value for the precession. Al-Batani's value, 54.5 arc-seconds per year, compares well with the current value of 50.3 arc-seconds per year (26,000 years for Earth's axis to round the circle of axial precession). Astronomy and astrology were considered to be the same thing, as evidenced by the practice of this science in Babylonia by priests. Mesopotamian astronomy became more astrology-based later in the civilisation, studying the stars in terms of horoscopes and omens.

==== Archaeology ====
Following the Late Bronze Age collapse, the practice of various sciences continued in post–Iron Age Mesopotamia. For instance, in the nascent history of archaeology, king Nabonidus of the Neo-Babylonian Empire was a pioneer in the analysis of artifacts. Foundation deposits of king Naram-Sin of the Akkadian Empire dated circa 2200 BC were discovered and analyzed by Nabonidus around the 550 BC. These deposits belonged to the temples of Shamash the sun god and the warrior goddess Annunitum in Sippar, and Naram-Sin's temple to the moon god in Harran, which were restored by Nabonidus. Nabonidus was the first known figure in history to make an attempt at dating archaeological artifacts found at excavated sites, though his estimates were inaccurate by hundreds of years.

=== Egypt ===
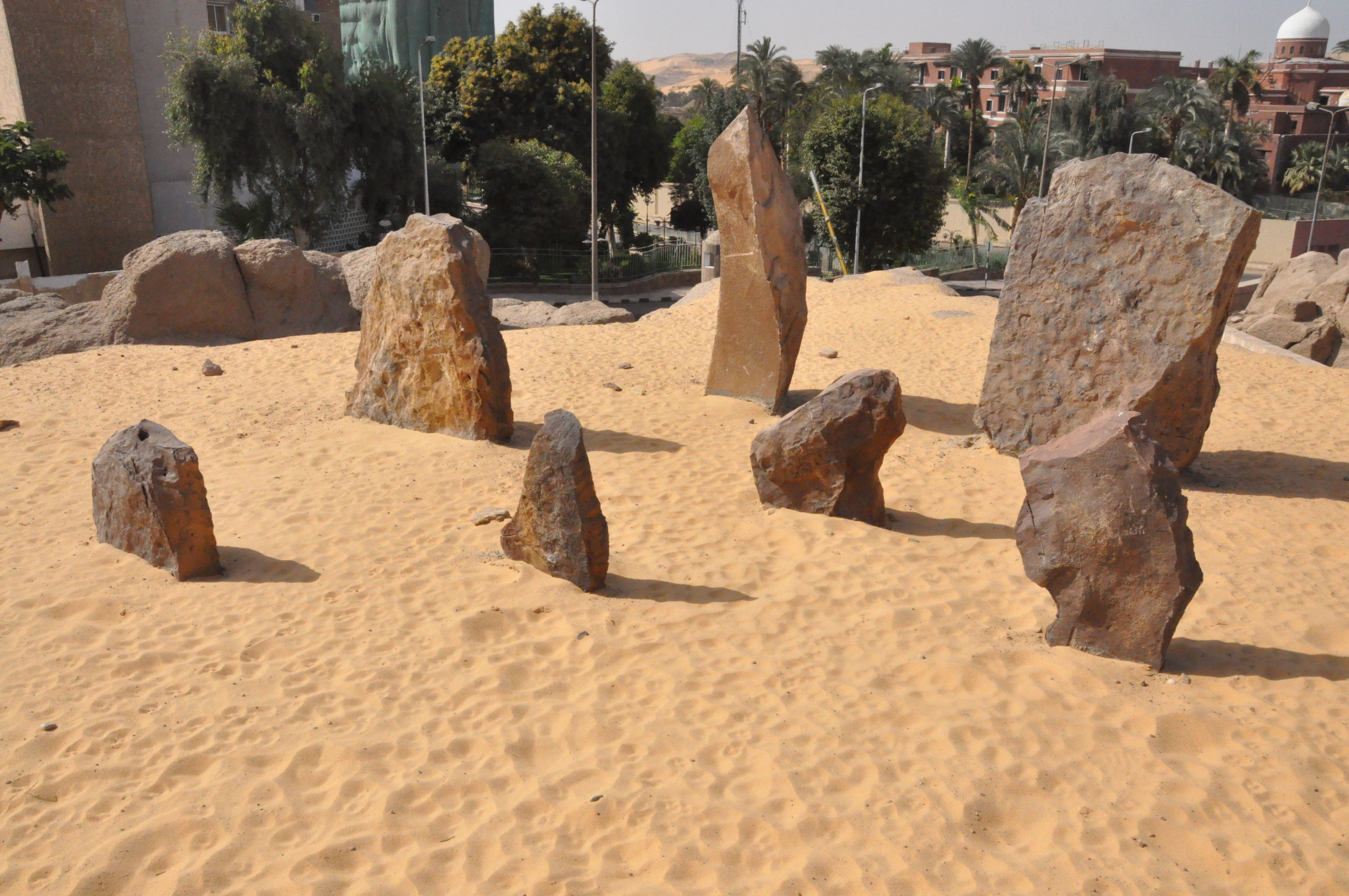
Megaliths from Nabta Playa, constructed by Neolithic populations, located in Aswan, Upper Egypt. Excavations of the megalith structures were completed in 2008.

Neolithic inhabitants constructed Nabta Playa megalithic structures, in Aswan located in Upper Egypt. These structures served to coordinate astronomical observations, religious practices and alignment with solar patterns and annual flooding cycles. These practices have been linked with the emergence of cosmology in Old Kingdom Egypt.

Archaeological evidence has suggested that the Ancient Egyptian counting system had origins in Sub-Saharan Africa. Also, fractal geometry designs which are widespread among Sub-Saharan African cultures are also found in Egyptian architecture and cosmological signs.The Ishango bone, according to scholar Alexander Marshack, may have influenced the later development of mathematics in Egypt as, like some entries on the Ishango bone, Egyptian arithmetic also made use of multiplication by 2; this however, is disputed.

Significant advances in ancient Egypt included astronomy, mathematics, and medicine. Egypt was also a centre of alchemical research for much of the Western world.

==== Architecture, engineering, and mathematics ====
Ancient Egyptian geometry was a necessary outgrowth of surveying to preserve the layout and ownership of farmland, which was flooded annually by the Nile. The 3–4–5 right triangle and other rules of thumb served to represent rectilinear structures, including architecture such as post and lintel structures.

==== Writing ====
Egyptian hieroglyphs served as the basis for the Proto-Sinaitic script, the ancestor of the Phoenician alphabet from which the later Hebrew, Greek, Latin, Arabic, and Cyrillic alphabets were derived. The city of Alexandria retained preeminence with its library, which was damaged by fire when it fell under Roman rule, being destroyed before 642. With it, a large amount of antique literature and knowledge was lost.

==== Medicine ====
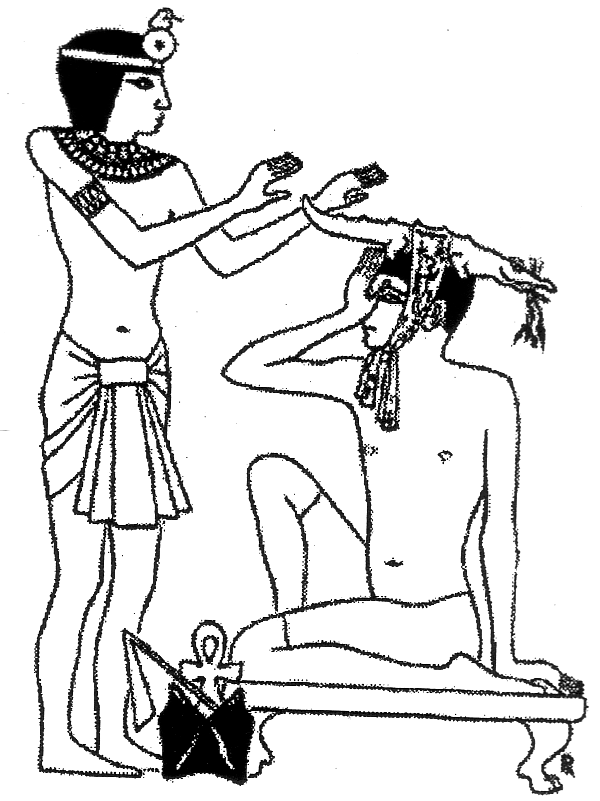
An Egyptian practice of treating migraine in ancient Egypt

The Edwin Smith Papyrus is one of the first medical documents still extant, and perhaps the earliest document that attempts to describe and analyse the brain: it might be seen as the very beginnings of modern neuroscience. However, while ancient Egyptian medicine had some effective practices, it was not without its ineffective and sometimes harmful practices. Medical historians believe that ancient Egyptian pharmacology was largely ineffective. Nevertheless, it applies the following components: examination, diagnosis, treatment and prognosis, to the treatment of disease, which display strong parallels to the basic empirical method of science and according to G. E. R. Lloyd played a significant role in the development of this methodology. The Ebers papyrus (c. 1550 BC) also contains evidence of traditional empiricism.

According to a paper published by Michael D. Parkins, 72% of 260 medical prescriptions in the Hearst Papyrus had no curative elements. According to Parkins, sewage pharmacology first began in ancient Egypt and was continued through the Middle Ages. Practices such as applying cow dung to wounds, ear piercing and tattooing, and chronic ear infections were important factors in developing tetanus. Frank J. Snoek wrote that Egyptian medicine used fly specks, lizard blood, swine teeth, and other such remedies which he believes could have been harmful.

=== Ancient Nubia ===
==== Medicine ====
Nubian mummies studied in the 1990s revealed that Kush was a pioneer of early antibiotics.

Tetracycline was being used by Nubians, based on bone remains between 350 AD and 550 AD. The antibiotic was in wide commercial use only in the mid 20th century. The theory states that earthen jars containing grain used for making beer contained the bacterium streptomyces, which produced tetracycline. Although Nubians were not aware of tetracycline, they could have noticed that people fared better by drinking beer than just consuming the grain itself. According to Charlie Bamforth, a professor of biochemistry and brewing science at the University of California, Davis, "They must have consumed it because it was rather tastier than the grain from which it was derived."

=== Mathematics ===
Based on engraved plans of Meroitic King Amanikhabali's pyramids, Nubians had a sophisticated understanding of mathematics as they appreciated the harmonic ratio. The engraved plans are indicative of much to be revealed about Nubian mathematics. The ancient Nubians also established a system of geometry which they used in creating early versions of sun clocks. During the Meroitic period in Nubian history, the Nubians used a trigonometric methodology similar to the Egyptians.

=== Persia ===
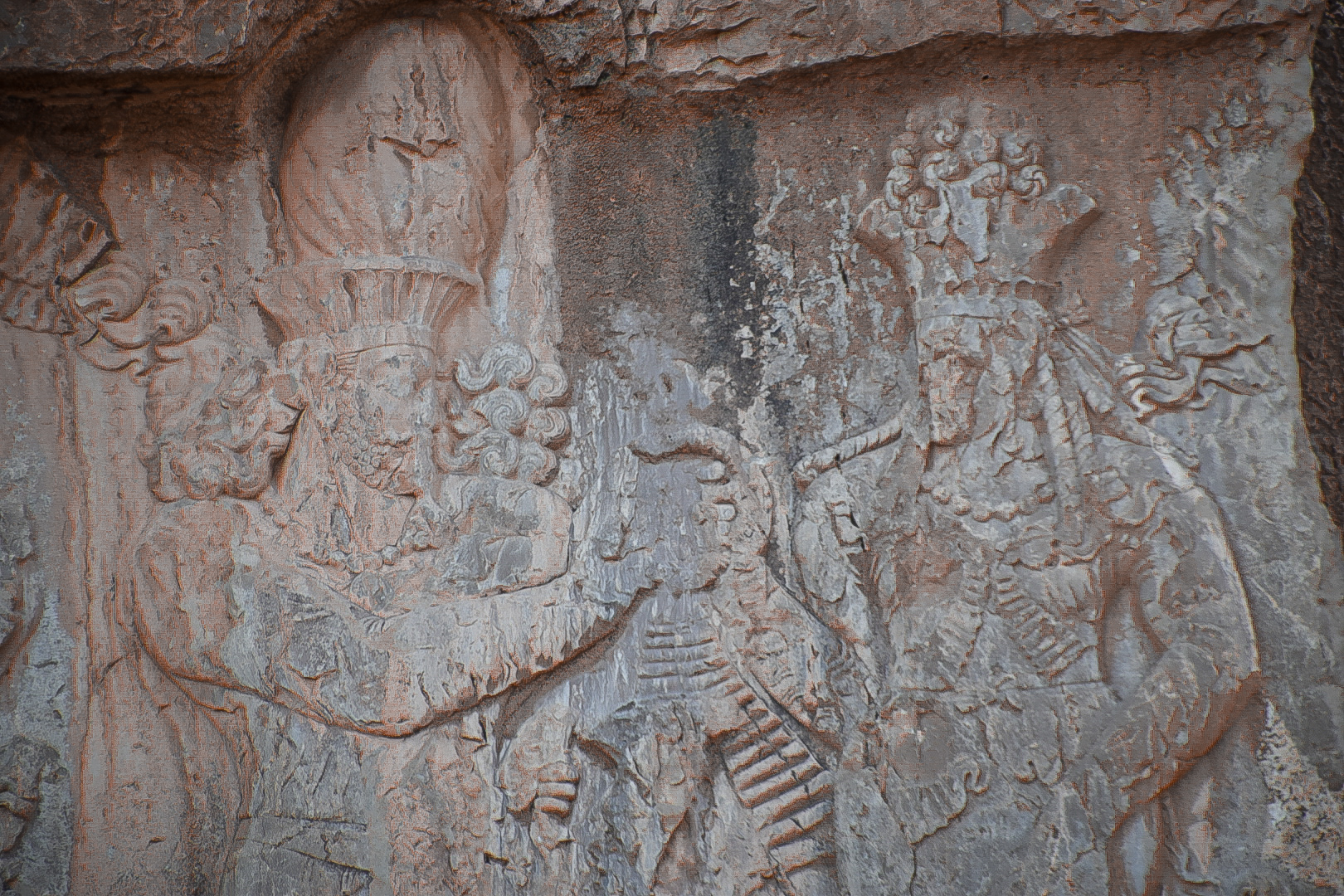
Scholar Nersi with Anahita in Persia

In the Sasanian Empire, great attention was given to mathematics and astronomy. The Academy of Gondishapur is a prominent example in this regard. Astronomical tables date to this period, and Sassanid observatories were later imitated by Muslim astronomers and astrologers of the Islamic Golden Age. In the mid-Sassanid era, an influx of knowledge came to Persia from the West in the form of views and traditions of Greece which, following the spread of Christianity, accompanied Syriac language. In the Early Middle Ages, Persia became a stronghold of Islamic science. After the establishment of Umayyad and Abbasid states, many Iranian scholars were sent to the capitals of these Islamic dynasties.

== Greco-Roman world ==
The legacy of classical antiquity included substantial advances in factual knowledge, especially in anatomy, zoology, botany, mineralogy, geography, mathematics and astronomy. Scholars advanced their awareness of the importance of certain scientific problems, especially those related to the problem of change and its causes. In the Hellenistic period, scholars frequently employed the principles developed in earlier Greek thought: the application of mathematics and deliberate empirical research.

=== Scientific practices ===
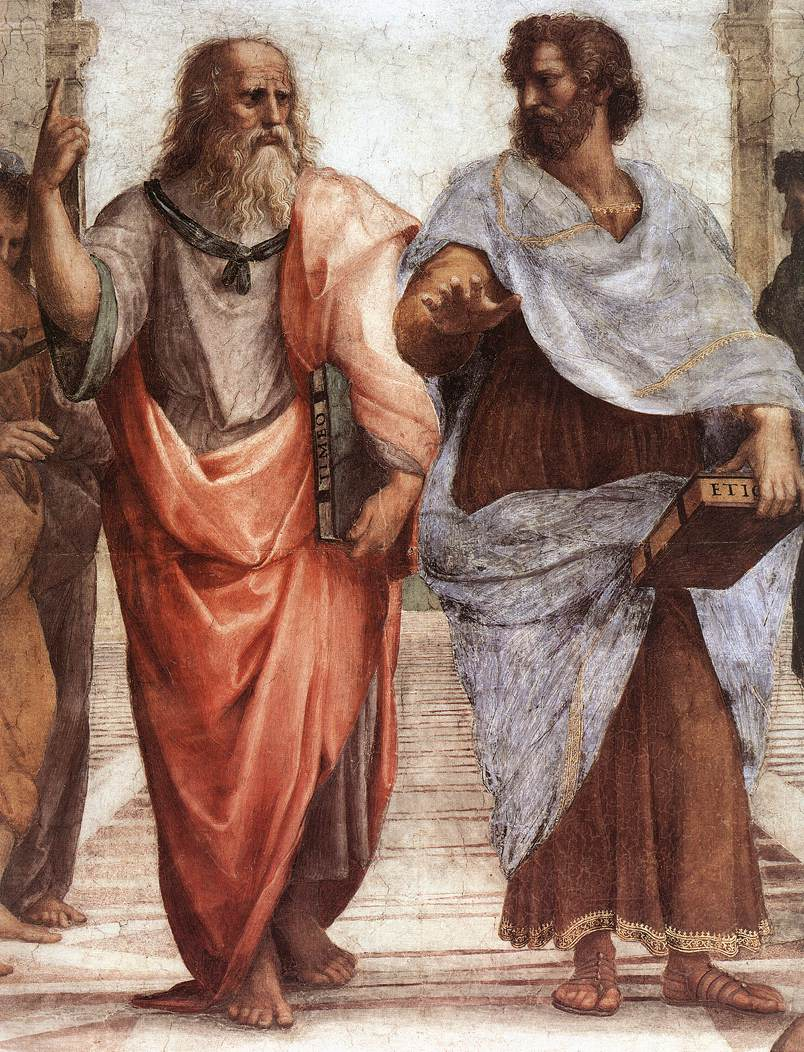
Plato and Aristotle (The School of Athens, 1511)

In classical antiquity, the inquiry into the workings of the universe took place both in investigations aimed at practical goals, such as calendar-making and medicine, and in abstract investigations known as natural philosophy. The ancient people who are considered the first scientists may have thought of themselves as "natural philosophers", as practitioners of a skilled profession, or as followers of a religious tradition.

Scientific thought in classical antiquity became tangible beginning in the 6th century BC in the pre-Socratic philosophy of Thales and Pythagoras. Thales, the "father of science", was the first to postulate non-supernatural explanations for natural phenomena such as lightning and earthquake. Pythagoras founded the Pythagorean school, which investigated mathematics and was the first to postulate that the Earth is spherical.

In about 385 BC, Plato founded the Academy. Aristotle, Plato's student, began the "scientific revolution" of the Hellenistic period culminating in the 3rd and 2nd centuries with scholars such as Eratosthenes, Euclid, Aristarchus of Samos, Hipparchus, and Archimedes. Plato and Aristotle's development of deductive reasoning was particularly useful to later scientific inquiry.

=== Astronomy ===
Schematics of the Antikythera mechanism

The level of achievement in Hellenistic astronomy and engineering is shown by the Antikythera mechanism. The astronomer Aristarchus of Samos was the first known person to propose a heliocentric model of the Solar System, while the geographer Eratosthenes accurately calculated the circumference of the Earth. Hipparchus produced the first systematic star catalogue.

=== Mathematics ===
The mathematician Euclid laid down the foundations of mathematical rigour and introduced the concepts of definition, axiom, theorem and proof still in use today in his Elements. Archimedes is credited with using the method of exhaustion to calculate the area under the arc of a parabola with the summation of an infinite series, and gave a remarkably accurate approximation of pi. He is also known in physics for his studies on hydrostatics and the principle of the lever.

=== Medicine ===
In medicine, Herophilos was the first to base his conclusions on the dissection of the human body and to describe the nervous system. Hippocrates and his followers were the first to describe many diseases and medical conditions. Galen performed many audacious operations—including brain and eye surgeries—that were not tried again for more than a millennia.

=== Mineralogy ===
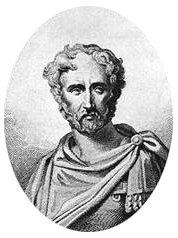
Pliny the Elder: an imaginative 19th-century portrait

Theophrastus wrote some of the earliest descriptions of plants and animals, establishing the first taxonomy and looking at minerals in terms of their properties such as hardness. Pliny the Elder produced the encyclopedia Natural HIstory in 77 AD. He accurately describes the octahedral shape of the diamond. His recognition of the importance of crystal shape is a precursor to modern crystallography, while mentioning numerous other minerals presages mineralogy. He also recognises that other minerals have characteristic crystal shapes, but in one example, confuses the crystal habit with the work of lapidaries. He was also the first to recognise that amber was a fossilized resin from pine trees because he had seen samples with trapped insects within them.

== Indian subcontinent ==
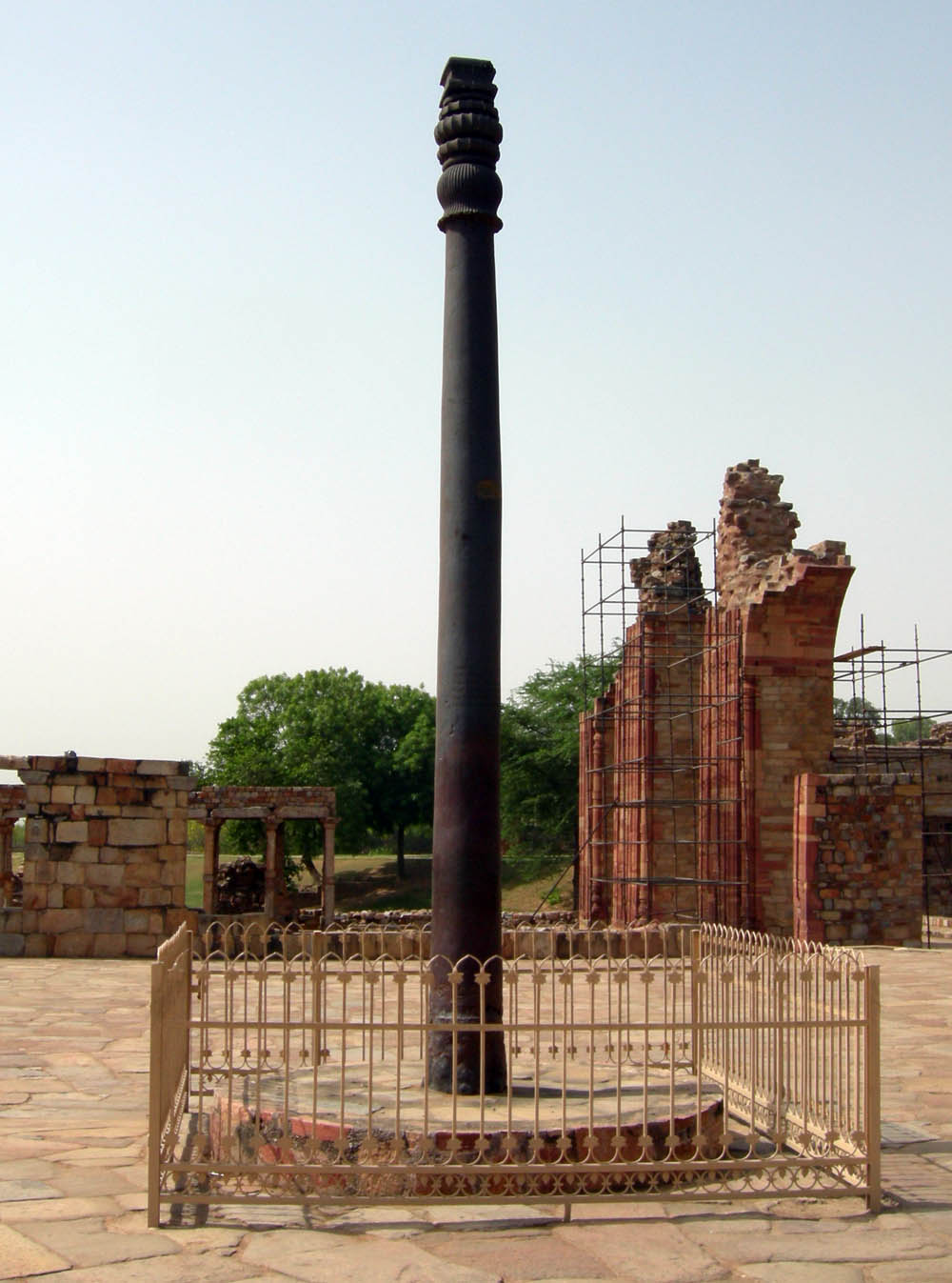
Ancient India was an early leader in metallurgy, as evidenced by the wrought iron Pillar of Delhi.

=== Mathematics and engineering ===
Excavations at Harappa, Mohenjo-daro and other sites of the Indus Valley Civilisation (IVC) have uncovered evidence of the use of "practical mathematics". The people of the IVC manufactured bricks whose dimensions were in the proportion 4:2:1, considered favourable for the stability of a brick structure. They used a standardised system of weights based on set ratios, with the unit weight equaling approximately 28 grams (1 oz). They mass-produced weights in regular geometrical shapes, which included hexahedra, barrels, cones, and cylinders, thereby demonstrating knowledge of basic geometry. Inhabitants of the IVC also tried to standardise the measurement of length to a high degree of accuracy. They designed the Mohenjo-Daro ruler, whose unit of length (34 millimetres (1.3 in)) was divided into ten equal parts. Bricks manufactured in ancient Mohenjo-Daro often had dimensions that were integral multiples of this unit of length.

The main authors of classical Indian mathematics (400 AD to 1200 AD) were scholars like Mahaviracharya, Aryabhata, Brahmagupta, and Bhāskara II. Indian mathematicians made early contributions to the study of the decimal system, zero, negative numbers, arithmetic, and algebra. Trigonometry, having been introduced to ancient India through Greek works, was further advanced in India. The modern definitions of sine and cosine were developed in India.

The Hindu–Arabic numeral system was developed in ancient India and spread to the later Islamic world to Al-Andalus where it was adopted (without the zero) by the French monk Gerbert of Aurillac, who would become Pope Sylvester II. Sylvester spread its usage throughout medieval Europe in the 11th century with the reintroduction of the Greco-Roman abacus calculating tool. The Bakhshali manuscript features negative numbers; it was compiled at an uncertain date between 200 AD and as late as 600 AD, after which they were used with certainty by Indian mathematician Brahmagupta.

=== Medicine ===
Mehrgarh, a Neolithic IVC site, provides the earliest known evidence for in vivo drilling of human teeth, with recovered samples dated to 7000–5500 BC.

Ayurveda medicine traces its origins to the Atharvaveda and is connected to Hinduism. The Sushruta Samhita of Sushruta appeared during the first millennium BC. Ayurvedic practice was flourishing during the time of the Buddha (around 520 BC), and in this period ayurvedic practitioners were commonly using mercuric–sulphur medicines. An important ayurvedic practitioner of this period was Nagarjuna. During the regime of Chandragupta II (375–415 AD), ayurveda was part of mainstream Indian medical techniques, and continued to be so until the Colonial period.

=== Astronomy ===
Early astronomy in India, as in other cultures, was intertwined with religion.The Rigveda is one of the oldest pieces of Indian literature. Rig Veda 1-64-11 & 48 describes time as a wheel with 12 parts and 360 spokes (days), with a remainder of 5, making reference to the solar calendar. Classical Indian astronomy documented in literature spans the Maurya Empire (with the Vedanga Jyotisha) to the Vijayanagara Empire (with the Kerala school). Classical Indian astronomy can be said to begin in the 5th century. Aryabhata produced the Aryabhatiya and the lost Arya-siddhānta, and Varāhamihira wrote the Pancha-siddhantika. Indian astronomy and astrology are based upon sidereal calculations, though a tropical system was also used in a few cases.

=== Alchemy ===
Alchemy was popular in India. Indian alchemist and philosopher Kaṇāda introduced the concept of anu, which he defined as matter which could not be subdivided. This is analogous to the concept of the atom in modern science.

=== Linguistics ===
Linguistics (along with phonology and morphology) first arose among Indian grammarians studying Sanskrit. Hemachandra wrote grammars of Sanskrit and Prakrit. His Siddha-Hema-Śabdanuśāśana included six Prakrit languages. He produced the only known grammar of Apabhraṃśa, illustrating it with the folk literature. Pāṇini's Sanskrit grammar contains a particularly detailed description of Sanskrit morphology, phonology, and roots.

== China and East Asia ==
=== Inventions ===
In his Science and Civilisation in China, Joseph Needham outlined China's "Four Great Inventions" (papermaking, compass, printing, and gunpowder). Needham highlighted the Han dynasty in particular as one of the most pivotal eras for Chinese sciences, noting the period's significant advancements in astronomy and calendar-making, the systematic documentation of living organisms in early forms of botany and zoology, and the philosophical skepticism and rationalism of the age embodied in works such as the Lunheng by Wang Chong.

Concurring with Needham, professors Jin Guantao, Fan Hongye, and Liu Qingfeng emphasize the Han dynasty as a unique period for Chinese scientific advancements comparable to the medieval Song dynasty. They also write that the protoscientific ideas of Mohism developed during the Warring States period could have provided a definitive structure for Chinese science, but was hindered by Chinese theology and dynastic royal promotion of Confucianism and its literary classics. Needham and other sinologists indicate that cultural factors prevented Chinese achievements from developing into what might be considered modern science, as the religious and philosophical framework of Chinese intellectuals hampered their efforts to rationalize the laws of nature.

=== Engineering ===
Greek astronomer Eratosthenes is the first known inventor of the armillary sphere in 255 BC. It is uncertain when the armillary sphere first appeared in China, though the Western Han astronomer Geng Shouchang was the first in China to add an equatorial ring to its design in 52 BC, with Jia Kui adding an ecliptic ring in 84 AD, followed by Zhang Heng adding the horizon and meridian rings.

Works by Zhang Heng were highly influential throughout later Chinese history. As a horologist, Zhang demonstrated the movement of recorded stars and planets by being the first to apply the hydropower of water wheels and water clock timer for automatically rotating the assembled rings of his armillary sphere, a model that would directly inspire the liquid escapement in astronomical clockworks pioneered in the Tang dynasty by Yi Xing and used by Song dynasty scientist Su Song in building his chain drive and water-driven astronomical clock tower. Zhang was not the first in China to utilize the motive power of waterwheels, since they were used in ferrous metallurgy by Du Shi to operate the bellows of a blast furnace to make pig iron, and the cupola furnace to make cast iron. Zhang invented a seismometer device with an inverted pendulum that detected the cardinal direction of distant earthquakes. It is unclear if Zhang invented or simply improved the designs of the odometer cart for measuring traveled distances and the non-magnetic south-pointing chariot that used differential gears to constantly point southward for navigation, though Three Kingdoms era engineer Ma Jun created a successful model of the chariot.

The odometer cart, depicted in Eastern Han art, was most likely invented in Western Han China by Luoxia Hong around 110 BC and separately by the Greeks (either Archimedes in the 3rd century BC or Hero of Alexandria in the 1st century AD).

=== Cartography ===
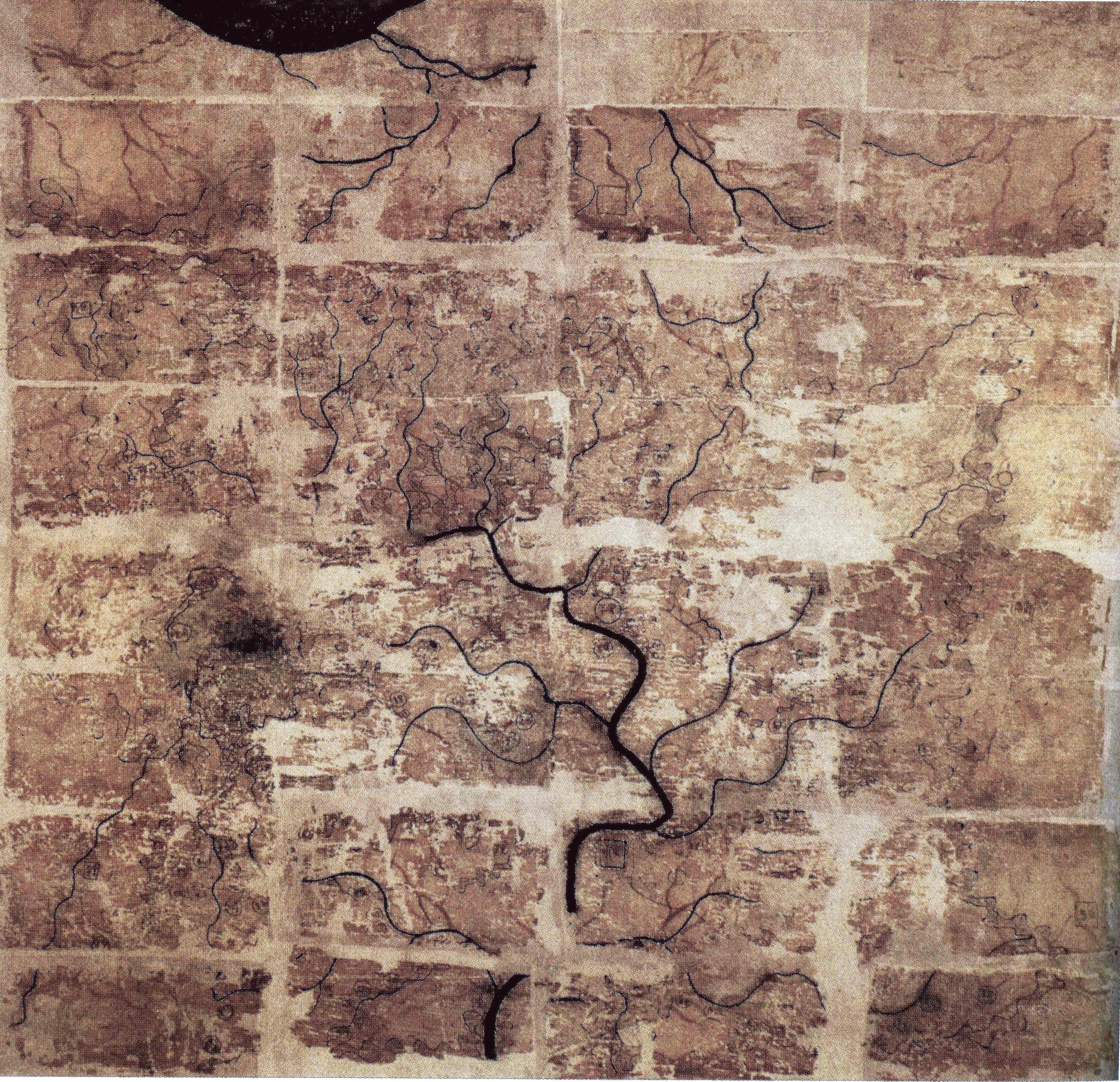
An early Western Han (202 BC – AD 9) silk map found in tomb 3 of Mawangdui, depicting the Kingdom of Changsha and Kingdom of Nanyue in southern China (note: the south direction is oriented at the top)

In cartography, Qin maps dating to the 4th century BC have been discovered and the Western Jin dynasty official Pei Xiu is the first known Chinese cartographer to have used a geometric grid reference that allowed for measurements on a graduated scale and for topographical elevation, though this might have been based on a rectangular grid system in maps made by Zhang Heng that are now lost.

=== Mathematics ===
In regards to mathematics, The Nine Chapters on the Mathematical Art, compiled in its entirety by 179 AD during the Eastern Han, is perhaps also the first text to utilize negative numbers. These were symbolized by counting rods in a slanted position, while red rods symbolizing negative numbers versus black rods that symbolize positive numbers may date back to the Western Han period.

Zhang Heng approximated pi as 3.162 using the square root of 10 (with an 8:5 ratio of the volume of a cube to an inscribed sphere), though this was less accurate than the earlier Liu Xin who calculated it as 3.154 using an unknown method. Zhang's calculation was improved upon by Three Kingdoms–era mathematician Liu Heng in his 263 AD commentary on The Nine Chapters on the Mathematical Art, providing a pi algorithm with a value of 3.14159, while Liu Song and Southern Qi–era mathematician Zu Chongzhi reached a value of 3.141592, the most accurate figure Chinese would achieve before exposure to Western mathematics.

=== Astronomy ===
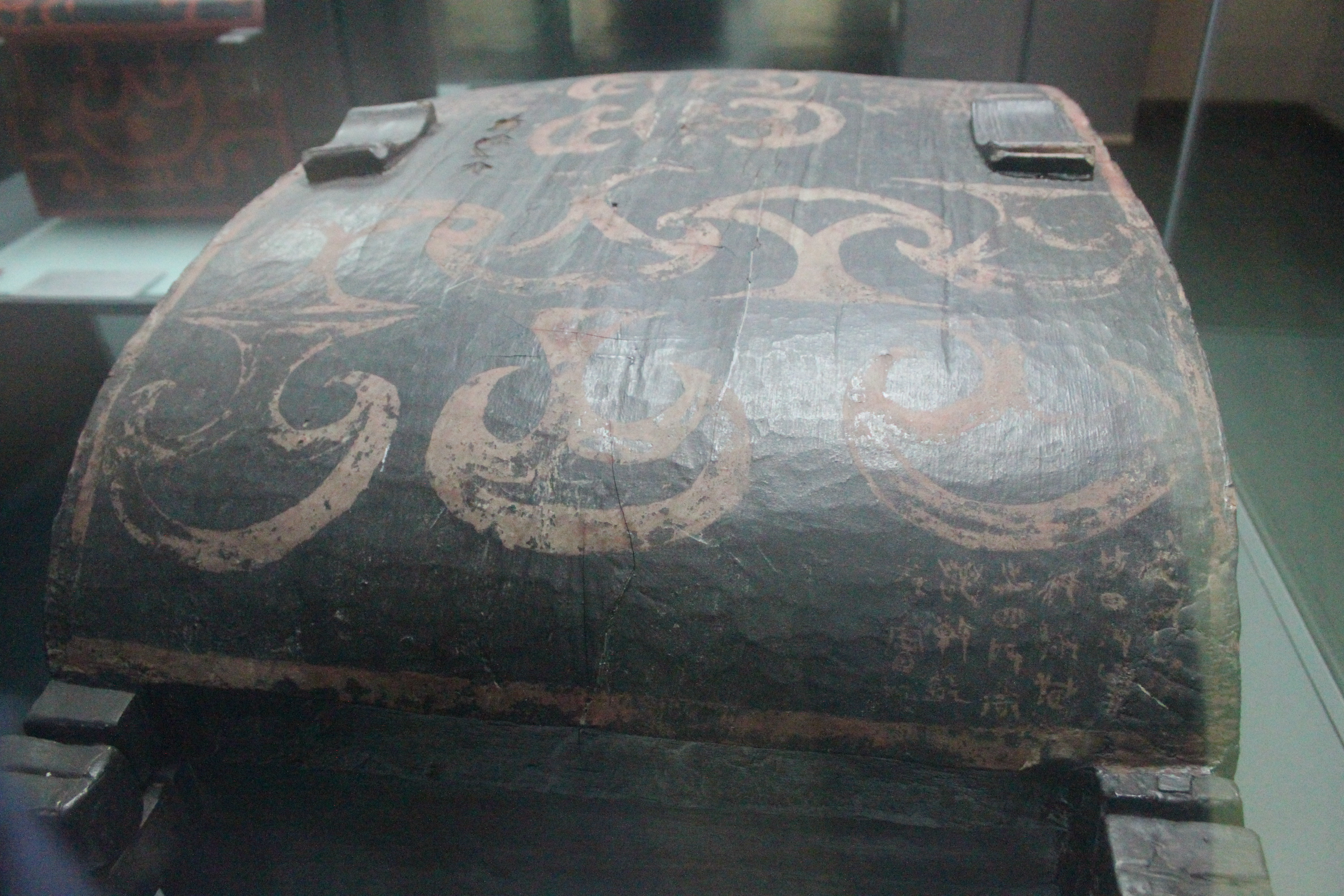
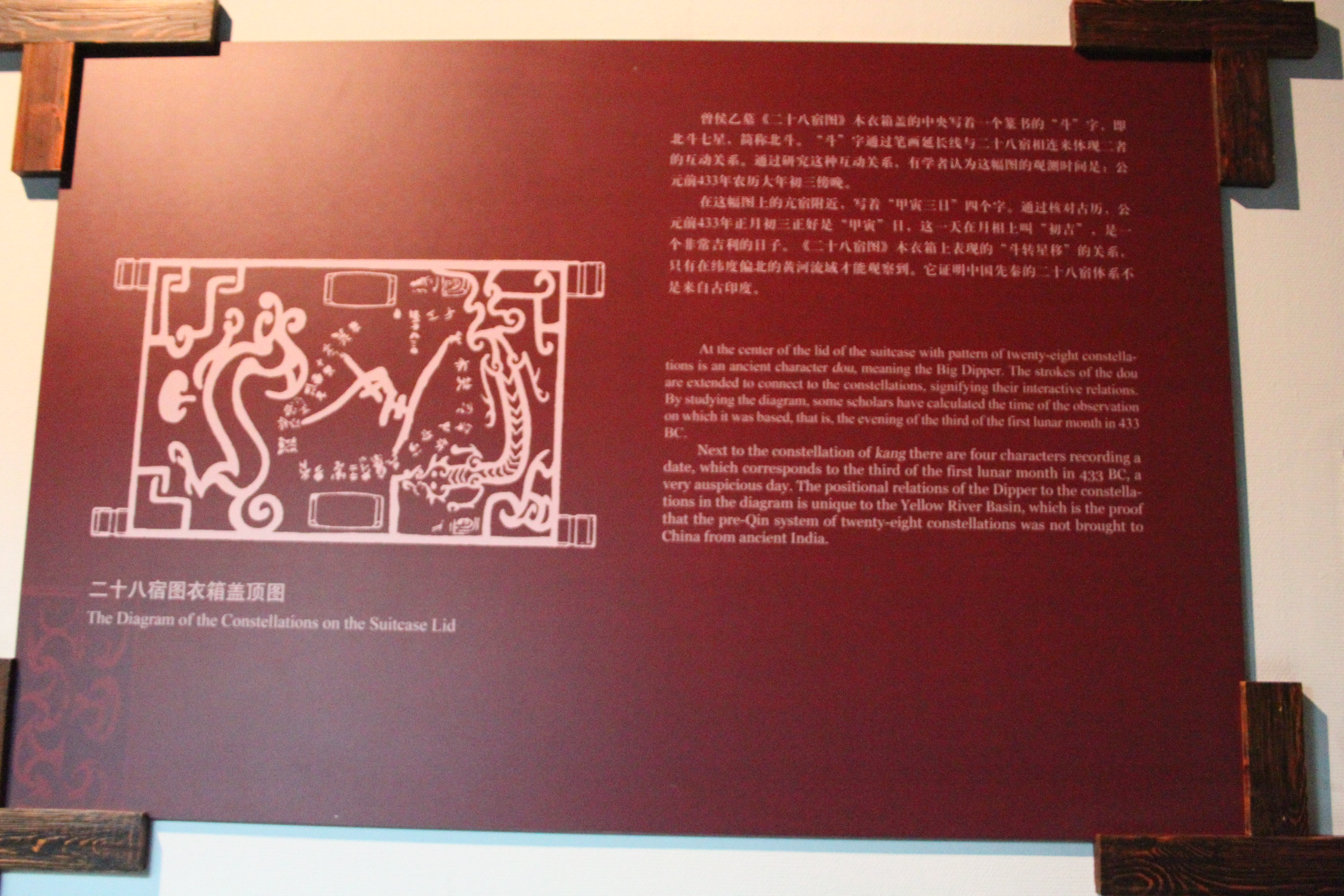
A lacquered wooden suitcase from the Tomb of Marquis Yi of Zeng, dated to the first lunar month of 433 BC, decorated with a star map depicting the twenty-eight mansions among constellations in Chinese astronomy

Early Chinese astronomy provides an example of the exhaustive documentation of the natural world and observable universe that often preoccupied Chinese scholars. Chinese star names are mentioned in oracle bone inscriptions of the Shang dynasty. Lists of stars along the ecliptic in the Chinese Twenty-Eight Mansions were provided on lacquerware of the 433 BC Tomb of Marquis Yi of Zeng and in the Lüshi Chunqiu encyclopedia of Qin statesman Lü Buwei, but it was not until the Han dynasty that full star catalogues were published that listed all stars in the observable celestial sphere. The Mawangdui Silk Texts, interred within a Western Han tomb in 168 BC, provide writings and ink illustrations of Chinese star maps showing Chinese constellations as well as comets. The Warring States–era astronomers Shi Shen and Gan De are traditionally thought to have published star catalogues in the 4th century BC, but it was the star catalogue of Sima Qian (145–86 BC) in his "Book of Celestial Offices" (天官書; Tianguan shu) in the Records of the Grand Historian that provided the model for all later Chinese star catalogues. Chinese constellations were later adopted in medieval Korean astronomy and Japanese astronomy. Building upon the star catalogue of Sima Qian that featured 90 constellations, the star catalogue of Zhang Heng published in 120 AD featured 124 constellations.

Nascent scientific ideas were established during the late Zhou dynasty and proliferated in the Han dynasty. Much like the earlier Aristotle in Greece, Wang Chong accurately described the water cycle of Earth but was dismissed by his contemporaries. However, Wang (similar to the Roman Lucretius) inaccurately criticized the then-mainstream Han Chinese hypotheses that the Sun and Moon are spherical and that the Moon is illuminated by the reflection of sunlight—the correct hypotheses being advocated by astronomer and music theorist Jing Fang and expanded upon by the polymath scientist and inventor Zhang Heng. Zhang theorized that the celestial sphere was round and structured like an egg with the Earth as its yolk, a geocentric model that was largely accepted in the contemporary Greco-Roman world.

=== Writing and linguistics ===
Analytical approaches were also applied to writing itself. Though the Erya of the Warring States period provides a basic dictionary, the first analytical Chinese dictionary to explain and dissect the logographic Chinese written characters, with 9,353 characters listed and categorized by radicals, was the Shuowen Jiezi composed by the Eastern Han philologist and politician Xu Shen.

=== Medicine ===
A seminal work of traditional Chinese medicine was the Huangdi Neijing (Yellow Emperor's Inner Canon) compiled between the 3rd and 2nd centuries BC, which viewed the human body's organs and tissues (zangfu) through the lens of the metaphysical five phases and yin and yang. The Huangdi Neijing also stated a belief in two circulatory channels of qi vital energy. Physicians of the Han dynasty believed that pulse diagnosis could be used to determine which organs in the body emitted qi energy, and therefore the ailments suffered by patients. The Huangdi Neijing is the first known Chinese text to describe the use of acupuncture, while golden acupuncture needles have been discovered in the tomb of Liu Sheng, Prince of Zhongshan (d. 113 BC) and stone-carved artworks of the Eastern Han period depict the practice. The Huangdi Neijing is also the first known text to describe diabetes and link it to the excessive consumption of sweet and fatty foods.

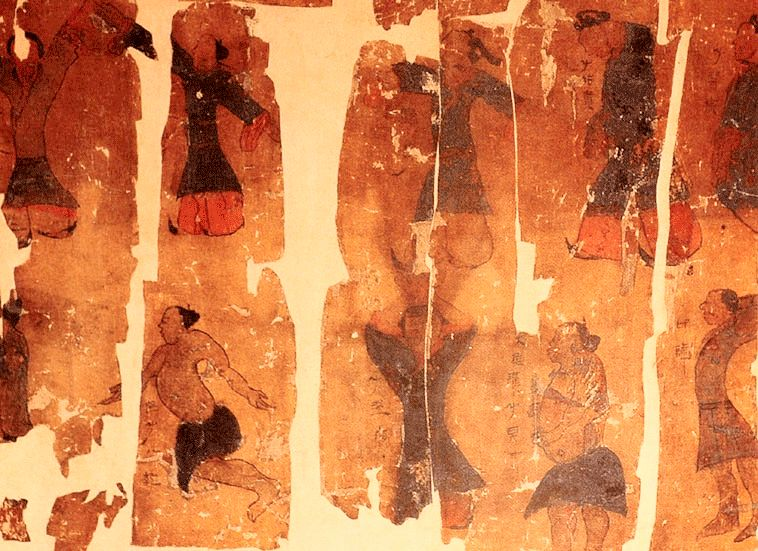
The physical exercise chart; a painting on silk depicting calisthenics; unearthed in 1973 in Hunan, China, from the 2nd-century BC Western Han burial site of Mawangdui, Tomb Number 3

In surgery, Han texts offered practical advice for certain procedures such as clinical lancing of abscesses. The first known physician in China to describe the use anesthesia for patients undergoing surgery was the Eastern Han physician Hua Tuo, who utilized his knowledge of Chinese herbology based in the Huangdi Neijing to create an ointment that healed surgical wounds within a month. One of his surgical procedures was the removal of a dead fetus from the womb of a woman whom he diagnosed and cured of her ailments. Hua's contemporary physician and pharmacologist Zhang Zhongjing preserved much of the medical knowledge known in China by the Eastern Han period in his major work Shanghan Lun (Treatise on Cold Injury and Miscellaneous Disorders) as well as the Jingui Yaolüe (Essential Medical Treasures of the Golden Chamber ).

Outside the major canon of Chinese medicine established during the Han period, modern archaeology has revealed previous Chinese discoveries in medicine. The Shuihudi Qin bamboo texts, dated to the 3rd century BC, provide some of the earliest known descriptions of the symptoms of leprosy (predating the Roman author Aulus Cornelius Celsus and perhaps also the Indian Sushruta Samhita, the oldest version of which is indeterminable). The Mawangdui silk texts of the 2nd century BC provide illustrated diagrams with textual captions for exercises in calisthenics.

== Pre-Columbian Mesoamerica ==
=== Writing ===
During the Middle Formative Period (c. 900 BC – c. 300 BC) of Pre-Columbian Mesoamerica, either the script of the Zapotec civilization or the script of the Olmec civilization (with the Cascajal Block being perhaps the earliest evidence) represent the earliest full writing systems of the Americas.

The Maya script, developed by the Maya civilization between 400–200 BC during its Preclassic period, was rooted in the Olmec and Zapotec writing systems, and became widespread in use by 100 BC. The Classic Maya language was built on the shared heritage of the Olmecs by developing the most sophisticated systems of writing, astronomy, calendrical science, and mathematics among urbanized Mesoamerican peoples.

=== Mathematics ===
The Maya developed a positional numeral system with a base of 20 that included the use of zero for constructing their calendars, with individual symbolic characters for numbers 1 through 19.

=== Astronomy ===
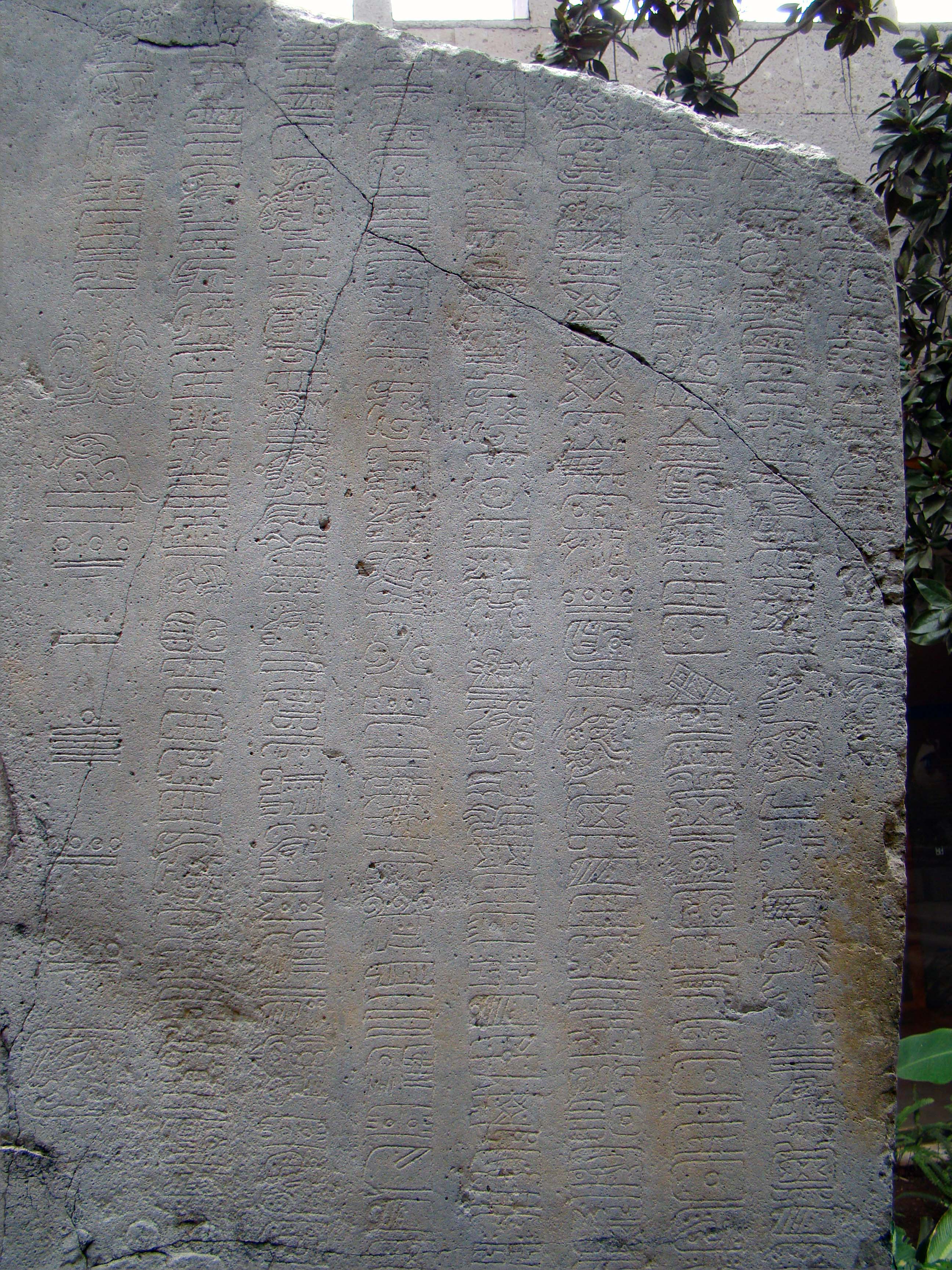
Detail showing columns of glyphs from a portion of the 2nd century AD La Mojarra Stela 1 (found near La Mojarra, Veracruz, Mexico); the left column gives a Long Count calendar date of 8.5.16.9.7, or 156 AD. The other columns visible are glyphs from the Epi-Olmec script.

The Zapotec created the first known astronomical calendar in Mesoamerica, though this was possibly under heavy influence by the Olmecs.

Maya writing contains easily discernible calendar dates in the form of logograms representing numbers, coefficients, and calendar periods amounting to 20 days (within 360-day years) and even 20 years for tracking social, religious, political, and economic events.

== Bibliography ==
- The odometer cart, depicted in Eastern Han art, was most likely invented in Western Han China by Luoxia Hong around 110 BC and separately by the Greeks (either Archimedes in the 3rd century BC or Hero of Alexandria in the 1st century AD).The odometer cart, depicted in Eastern Han art, was most likely invented in Western Han China by Luoxia Hong around 110 BC and separately by the Greeks (either Archimedes in the 3rd century BC or Hero of Alexandria in the 1st century AD).The odometer cart, depicted in Eastern Han art, was most likely invented in Western Han China by Luoxia Hong around 110 BC and separately by the Greeks (either Archimedes in the 3rd century BC or Hero of Alexandria in the 1st century AD).The odometer cart, depicted in Eastern Han art, was most likely invented in Western Han China by Luoxia Hong around 110 BC and separately by the Greeks (either Archimedes in the 3rd century BC or Hero of Alexandria in the 1st century AD).The odometer cart, depicted in Eastern Han art, was most likely invented in Western Han China by Luoxia Hong around 110 BC and separately by the Greeks (either Archimedes in the 3rd century BC or Hero of Alexandria in the 1st century AD).The odometer cart, depicted in Eastern Han art, was most likely invented in Western Han China by Luoxia Hong around 110 BC and separately by the Greeks (either Archimedes in the 3rd century BC or Hero of Alexandria in the 1st century AD).The odometer cart, depicted in Eastern Han art, was most likely invented in Western Han China by Luoxia Hong around 110 BC and separately by the Greeks (either Archimedes in the 3rd century BC or Hero of Alexandria in the 1st century AD).The odometer cart, depicted in Eastern Han art, was most likely invented in Western Han China by Luoxia Hong around 110 BC and separately by the Greeks (either Archimedes in the 3rd century BC or Hero of Alexandria in the 1st century AD).The odometer cart, depicted in Eastern Han art, was most likely invented in Western Han China by Luoxia Hong around 110 BC and separately by the Greeks (either Archimedes in the 3rd century BC or Hero of Alexandria in the 1st century AD).The odometer cart, depicted in Eastern Han art, was most likely invented in Western Han China by Luoxia Hong around 110 BC and separately by the Greeks (either Archimedes in the 3rd century BC or Hero of Alexandria in the 1st century AD).Nasser, Mona; Tibi, Aida; Savage-Smith, Emilie (1 February 2009). "Ibn Sina's Canon of Medicine: 11th century rules for assessing the effects of drugs". Journal of the Royal Society of Medicine. 102 (2): 78–80. doi:10.1258/jrsm.2008.08k040. PMC 2642865. PMID 19208873.
- Needham, Joseph, Science and Civilization in China, volume 1. (Cambridge University Press, 1954)
- Pedersen, Olaf. Early Physics and Astronomy: A Historical Introduction. 2nd edition. Cambridge: Cambridge University Press, 1993.
- Sardar, Marika. “Astronomy and Astrology in the Medieval Islamic World.” Metmuseum.org, https://www.metmuseum.org/toah/hd/astr/hd_astr.htm.
- Tibi, Selma (April 2006). "Al-Razi and Islamic medicine in the 9th century". Journal of the Royal Society of Medicine. 99 (4): 206–207. doi:10.1177/014107680609900425. PMC 1420785. PMID 16574977.
- Upton, Joseph M. (1933). "A Manuscript of 'The Book of the Fixed Stars' by ʿAbd Ar-Raḥmān Aṣ-Ṣūfī". Metropolitan Museum Studies. 4 (2): 179–197. doi:10.2307/1522800. JSTOR 1522800.
