= Chinese astronomy =

Aspect of science history

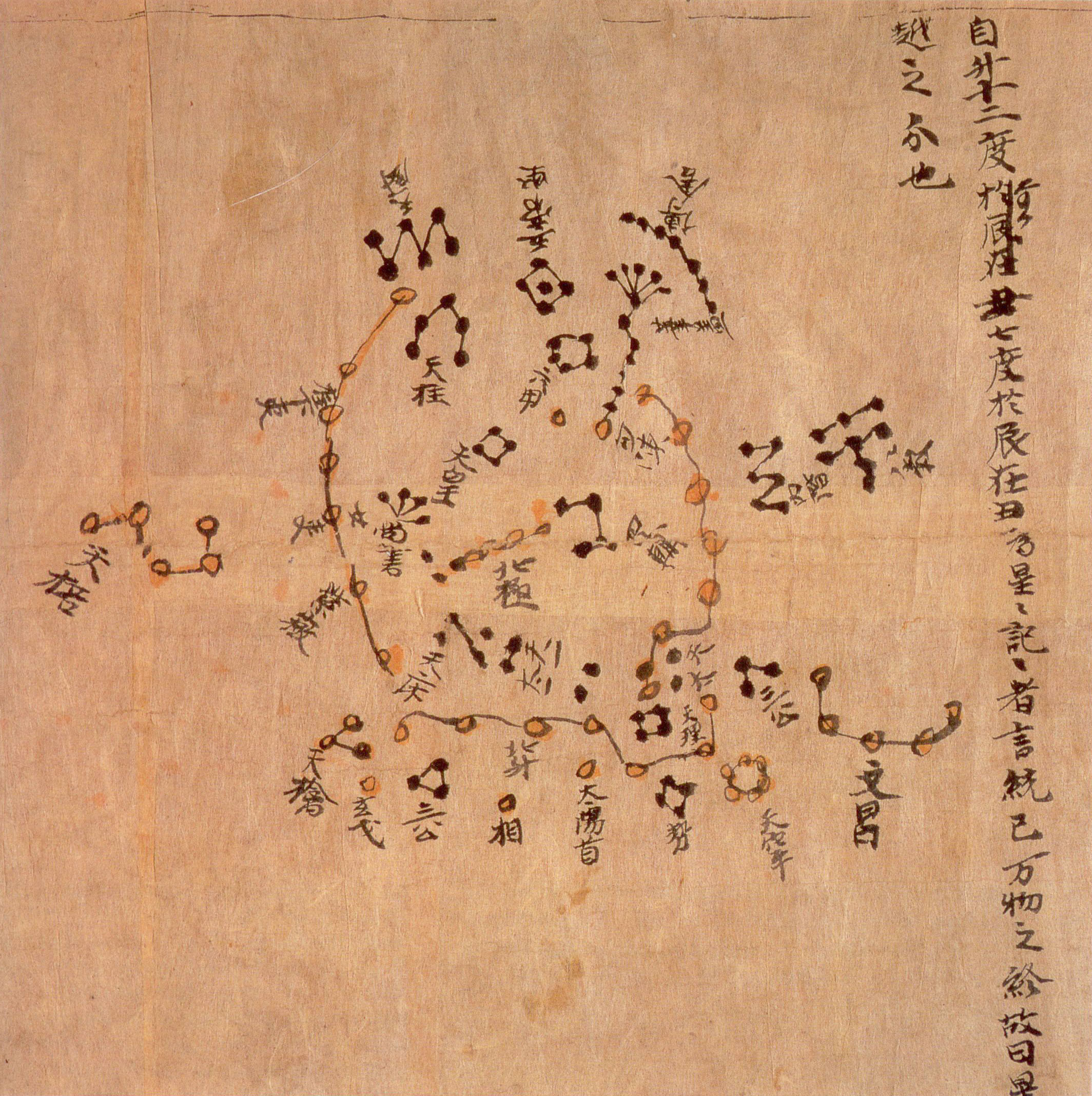
The Dunhuang map from the Tang dynasty (schools were distinguished with different colors: white, black, and yellow for the stars of Wu Xian, Gan De, and Shi Shen respectively. The whole set of star maps contain 1,300 stars.

Astronomy in China has a long history stretching from the Shang dynasty, being refined over a period of more than 3,000 years. The ancient Chinese people have identified stars from 1300 BCE, as Chinese star names later categorized in the twenty-eight mansions have been found on oracle bones unearthed at Anyang, dating back to the mid-Shang dynasty. The core of the "mansion" (宿 xiù) system also took shape around this period, by the time of King Wu Ding (1250–1192 BCE).

Detailed records of astronomical observations began during the Warring States period (fourth century BCE). They flourished during the Han period (202 BCE – 220 CE) and subsequent dynasties with the publication of star catalogues. Chinese astronomy was equatorial, centered on close observation of circumpolar stars, and was based on different principles from those in traditional Western astronomy, where heliacal risings and settings of zodiac constellations formed the basic ecliptic framework. Joseph Needham has described the ancient Chinese as the most persistent and accurate observers of celestial phenomena anywhere in the world before the Islamic astronomers.

Some elements of Indian astronomy reached China with the expansion of Buddhism after the Eastern Han dynasty (25–220 CE), but most incorporation of Indian astronomical thought occurred during the Tang dynasty (618–907 CE), when numerous Indian astronomers took up residence in the Chinese capital Chang'an, and Chinese scholars, such as the Tantric Buddhist monk and mathematician Yi Xing, mastered the Indian system. Islamic astronomers collaborated closely with their Chinese colleagues during the Yuan dynasty, and, after a period of relative decline during the Ming dynasty, astronomy was revitalized under the stimulus of Western cosmology and technology after the Jesuits established their missions. The telescope was introduced from Europe in the seventeenth century. In 1669, the Peking observatory was completely redesigned and refitted under the direction of Ferdinand Verbiest. Today, China continues to be active in the field of astronomy, with many observatories and its own space program.

== Early history ==
=== Purpose of astronomical observations in the past ===
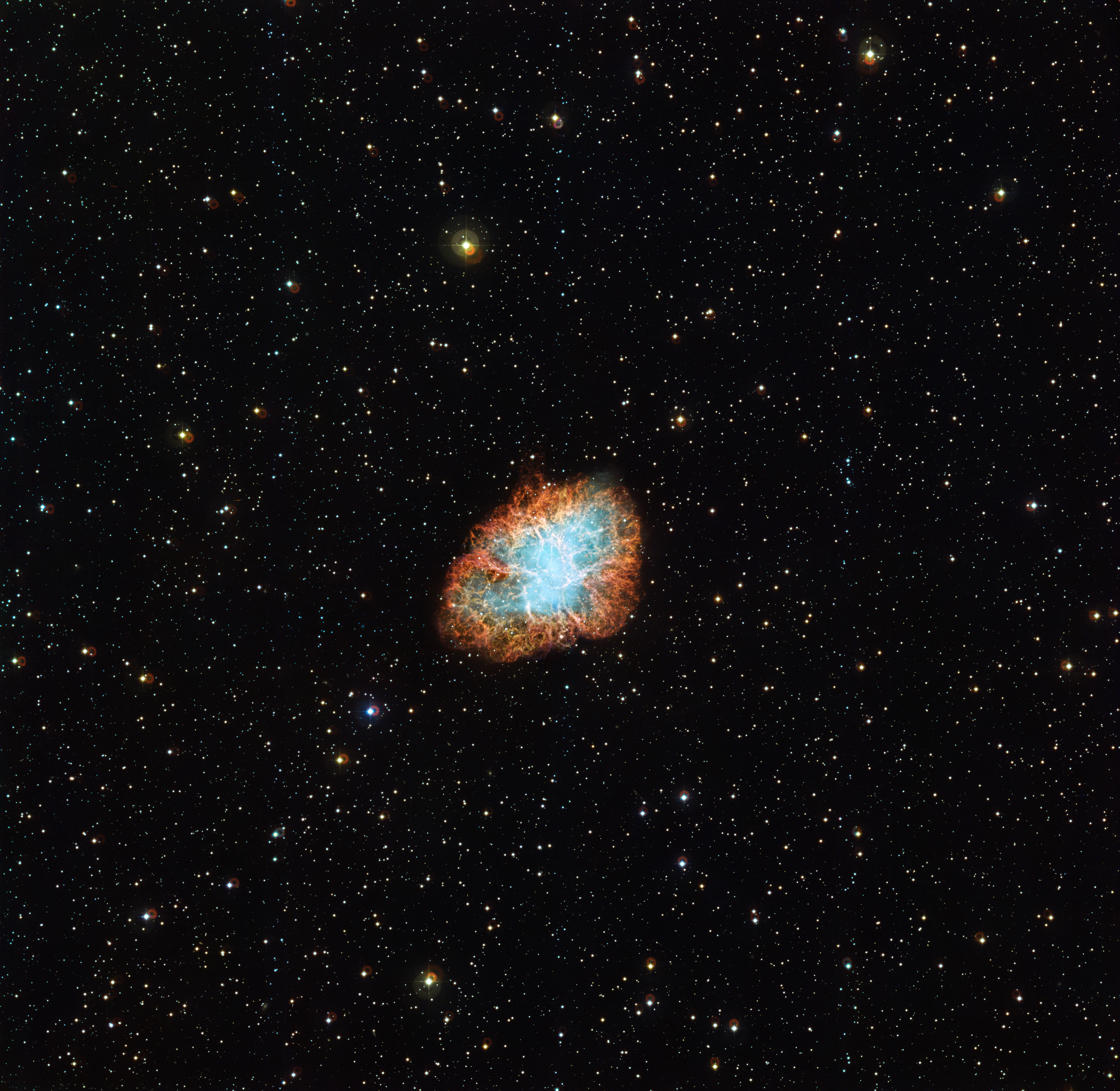
Wide view of the Crab Nebula.

One of the main functions of astronomy was for the purpose of timekeeping. The Chinese used a lunisolar calendar, but as the cycles of the Sun and the Moon are different, leap months had to be inserted regularly. The Chinese calendar was considered to be a symbol of a dynasty. As dynasties would rise and fall, astronomers and astrologers of each period would often prepare a new calendar, making observations for that purpose.

Astrological divination was also an important part of astronomy. Astronomers took note of "guest stars", usually supernovas or comets, which appear among the fixed stars. The supernova which created the Crab Nebula, now known as SN 1054, is an example of an astronomical event observed by Ancient Chinese astronomers. Ancient astronomical records of phenomena like comets and supernovae are sometimes used in modern astronomical studies.

=== Cosmology ===
The Chinese developed multiple cosmological models before Western influences changed the field:

- Gai Tian ("canopy heaven") – The sky is a hemisphere, the Earth is a disc at the bottom, surrounded by water, which rotates around the North Pole once a day. The Sun traces a circle in the hemisphere, the size of which varies with the seasons. As described in the Zhoubi Suanjing.
- Hun Tian ("the entire sky") – Similar to Gai Tian, but the sky is a full sphere. The seasons are explained by the North Pole shifting rather than remaining directly overhead.
- Shuen Ye, Xuan Ye, or Suan Ye – The heavens are infinite in extent, the celestial bodies are floating about on their own at rare intervals, and "the speed of the luminaries depends on their individual natures, which shows they are not attached to anything." Very few pieces of information are known about this school of thought.

== Constellations ==
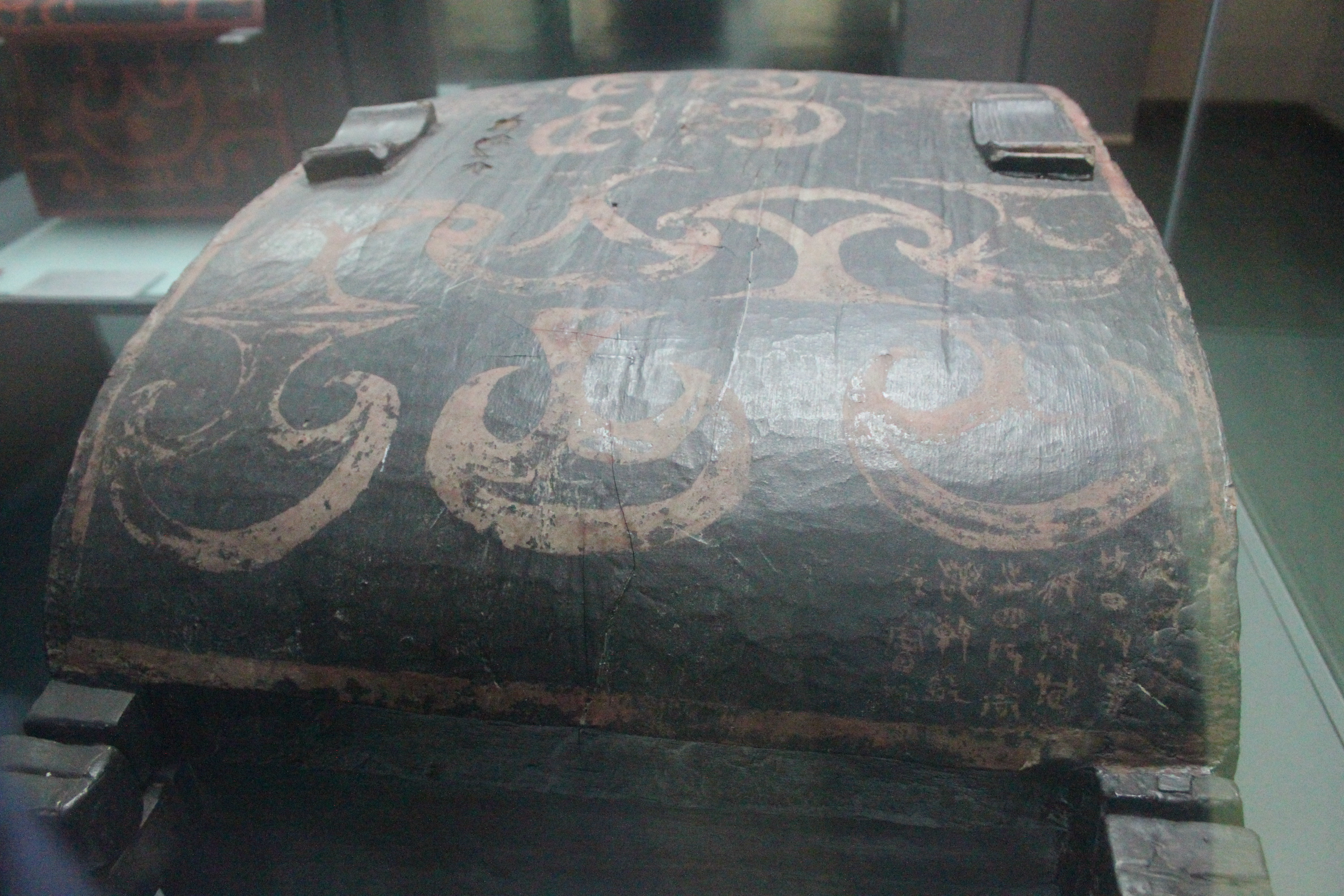
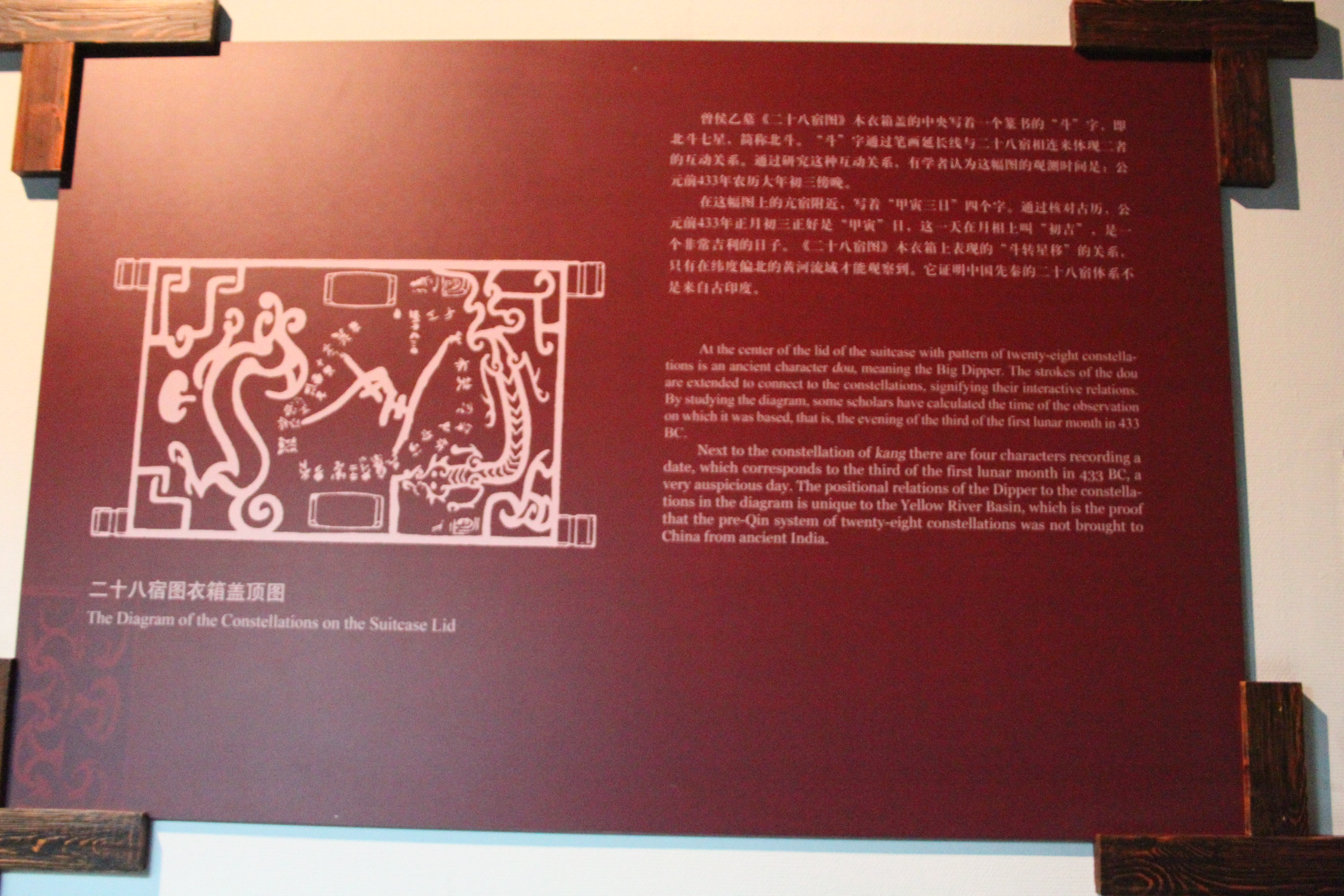
A lacquered wooden suitcase from the Tomb of Marquis Yi of Zeng, dated to the first lunar month of 433 BC, decorated with a star map depicting the twenty-eight mansions among constellations in Chinese astronomy

The divisions of the sky began with the Northern Dipper and the 28 mansions. In 1977, a lacquer box was excavated from the Tomb of Marquis Yi of Zeng, in Suixian, Hubei Province. Names of the 28 lunar mansions were found on the cover of the box, proving that the use of this classification system was made before 433 BCE.

As lunar mansions have such an ancient origin, the meanings of most of their names have become obscure. Contributing to later confusion, the name of each lunar mansion consists of only one Chinese word, the meaning of which could vary at different times in history. The meanings of the names are still under discussion.

Besides the 28 lunar mansions, most constellations are based on the works of Shi Shen-fu and Gan De, who were astrologists during the period of the Warring States (481–221 BCE) in China. In his Shiji, the Western Han era historian Sima Qian (145–86 BCE) provided a star catalogue that includes 90 constellations. The Eastern Han era polymath scientist and inventor Zhang Heng (78–139 CE) published a star catalogue in 120 CE that features 124 recorded constellations. In the late period of the Ming dynasty, the agricultural scientist and mathematician Xu Guangqi (1562–1633 CE) introduced 23 additional constellations near to the Celestial South Pole, which are based on star catalogues from the Western world introduced by his colleague, the Italian Jesuit Matteo Ricci.

== Star catalogues and maps ==
=== Star catalogues ===
In the fourth century BCE, the two Chinese astronomers responsible for the earliest information going into the star catalogues were Shi Shen and Gan De of the Warring States period.

Author	Translated name	Chinese catalogue name	Pinyin
Shi Shen	Shi Shen astronomy	石申天文	Shi Shen tianwen
Gan De	Astronomic star observation	天文星占	Tianwen xingzhan

These books appeared to have lasted until the sixth century, but were lost after that. A number of books share similar names, often quoted and named after them. These texts should not be confused with the original catalogues written by them. Notable works that helped preserve the contents include:

Author	Translated name	Chinese name	Pinyin	Comments
Sima Qian	Book of Celestial Offices	天官書	Tianguan shu	This is the astronomical chapter of the Records of the Grand Historian, a massive history compiled during the late 2nd century BCE by the Han-era scholar and official Sima Qian. This chapter provides a star catalogue and discusses the schools of Gan De and Shi Shen.
Ma Xian (馬顯)	Star Manual of the Masters Gan and Shi	甘石星經	Gan Shi Xingjing	Despite having the name credited to Shi and Gan, it was lost and later compiled circa 579 CE as an appendix to the Treatise on Astrology of the Kaiyuan Era, and summarized in the book 郡齋讀書志.
	Book of Jin	晉書	Jin shu	In the astronomical chapters of the text
	Book of Sui	隋書	Sui shu	
Gautama Siddha	Treatise on Astrology of the Kaiyuan Era	開元占經	Kaiyuan Zhanjing	During the reign of Emperor Xuanzong of Tang (712–756 CE). After analyzing and providing a summary on the work of Gan De and Shi Shen, Tang era astronomers mentioned the names of more than 800 stars that were found, 121 of them marked with positions. The astronomical table of sines by the Indian astronomer and mathematician Aryabhata were also translated into the Kaiyuan Zhanjing.
	The Great Firmament Star Manual Common to Astrology	通占大象曆星經	Tongzhan taxiangli xingjing	This renamed star manual is incorporated in the Taoist book Daozang.

Wu Xian (巫咸) has been one of the astronomers under debate. He is often represented as one of the "Three Schools Astronomical tradition", along with Gan and Shi. The Chinese classic text Star Manual of Master Wu Xian (巫咸星經) and its authorship is still in dispute, because it mentioned names of twelve countries that did not exist in the Shang dynasty, the era in which it was supposed to have been written. Moreover, it was customary in the past for the Chinese to forge works of notable scholars, as this could lead to a possible explanation for the inconsistencies found. Wu Xian is generally mentioned as the astronomer who lived many years before Gan and Shi.

The Han dynasty astronomer and inventor Zhang Heng (78–139 CE) not only catalogued some 2500 different stars, but also recognized more than 100 different constellations. Zhang Heng also published his work Ling Xian, a summary of different astronomical theories in China at the time. In the subsequent period of the Three Kingdoms (220–280 CE), Chen Zhuo (陳卓) combined the work of his predecessors, forming another star catalogue. This time, 283 constellations and 1464 stars were listed. The astronomer Guo Shoujin of the Yuan dynasty (1279–1368 CE) created a new catalogue, which was believed to contain thousands of stars. Unfortunately, many of the documents of that period were destroyed, including that of Shoujin. Imperial Astronomical Instruments (儀象考成) was published in 1757 and contains 3083 stars exactly.

=== Star maps ===
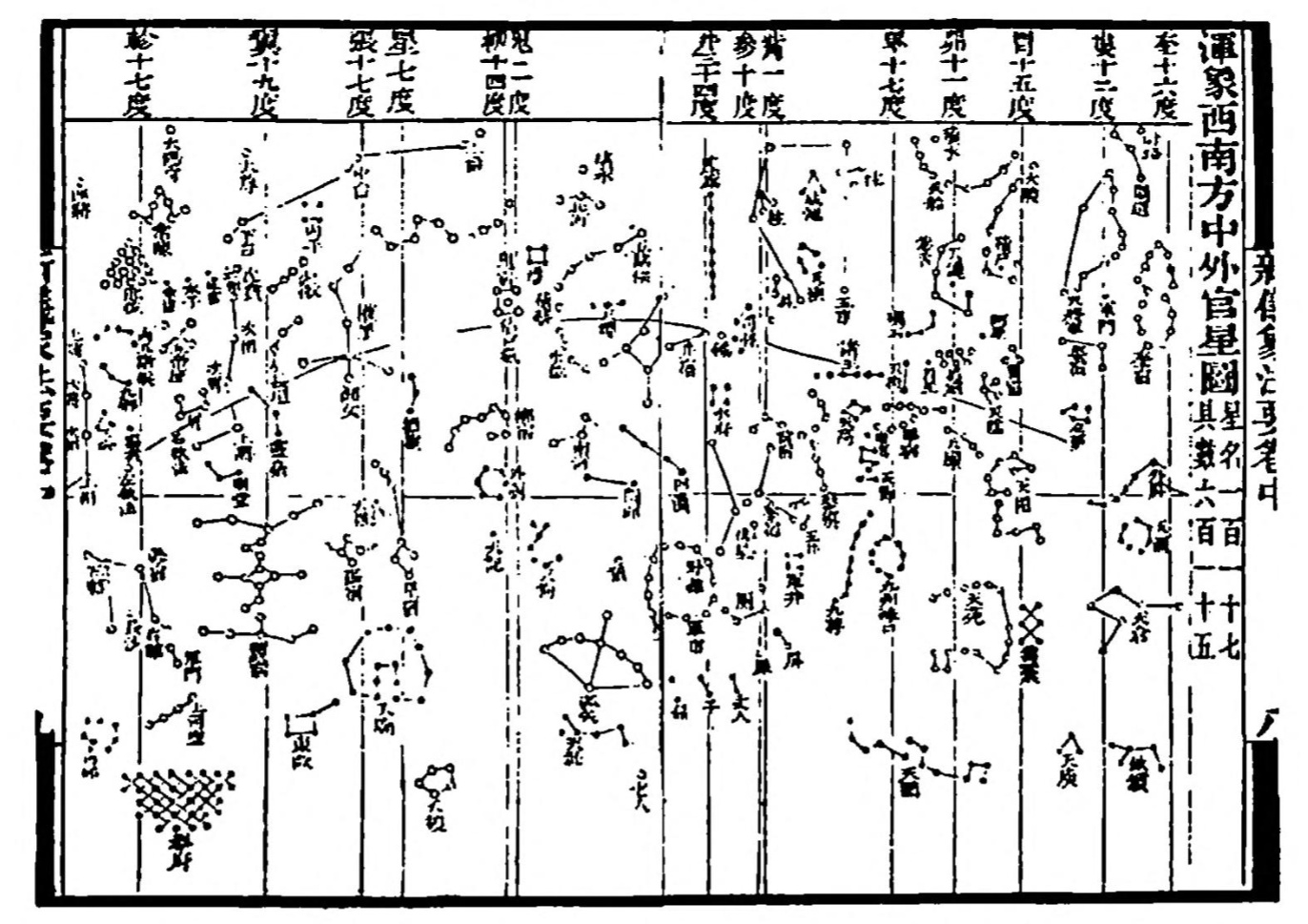
A star map with a cylindrical projection. Su Song's star maps represent the oldest existent ones in printed form.

The Chinese drew many maps of stars in the past centuries. It is debatable as to which counts as the oldest star maps, since pottery and old artifacts can also be considered star maps. One of the oldest existent star maps in printed form is from Su Song's (1020–1101 CE) celestial atlas of 1092 CE, which was included in the horological treatise on his clocktower. The most famous one is perhaps the Dunhuang map found in Dunhuang, Gansu. Uncovered by the British archaeologist Marc Aurel Stein in 1907, the star map was brought to the British Museum in London. The map was drawn on paper and represents the complete sky, with more than 1,350 stars. Although ancient Babylonians and Greeks also observed the sky and catalogued stars, no such complete record of the stars may exist or survive. Hence, this is the oldest chart of the skies at present.

According to recent studies, the map may date the manuscript to as early as the seventh century CE (Tang dynasty). Scholars believe the star map dates from 705 to 710 CE, which is the reign of Emperor Zhongzong of Tang. There are some texts (Monthly Ordinances, 月令) describing the movement of the sun along the sky each month, which was not based on the observation at that time.

== Solar and lunar eclipses ==
Chinese astronomers recorded 1,600 observations of solar and lunar eclipses from 750 BCE. The ancient Chinese astronomer Shi Shen (fl. fourth century BCE) was aware of the relation of the Moon in a solar eclipse, as he provided instructions in his writing to predict them by using the relative positions of the Moon and the Sun. The radiating-influence theory, where the Moon's light was nothing but a reflection of the Sun's, was supported by the mathematician and music theorist Jing Fang (78–37 BCE), yet opposed by the Chinese philosopher Wang Chong (27–97 CE), who made clear in his writing that this theory was nothing new. Jing Fang wrote:

The moon and the planets are Yin; they have shape but no light. This they receive only when the sun illuminates them. The former masters regarded the sun as round like a crossbow bullet, and they thought the moon had the nature of a mirror. Some of them recognized the moon as a ball too. Those parts of the moon which the sun illuminates look bright, those parts which it does not, remain dark.

The ancient Greeks had known this as well, since Parmenides and Aristotle supported the theory of the Moon shining because of reflected light. The Chinese astronomer and inventor Zhang Heng (78–139 CE) wrote of both solar eclipse and lunar eclipse in the publication of Ling Xian (靈憲), 120 CE:

The sun is like fire and the moon like water. The fire gives out light and the water reflects it. Thus, the moon's brightness is produced from the radiance of the sun, and the moon's darkness (pho) is due to (the light of) the sun being obstructed (pi). The side which faces the sun is fully lit, and the side which is away from it is dark. The planets (as well as the moon) have the nature of water and reflect light. The light pouring forth from the sun (tang jih chih chhung kuang) does not always reach the moon, owing to the obstruction (pi) of the earth itself—this is called 'an-hsü', a lunar eclipse. When (a similar effect) happens with a planet (we call it) an occultation (hsing wei); when the moon passes across (kuo) (the sun's path) then there is a solar eclipse (shih).

The later Song dynasty scientist Shen Kuo (1031–1095 CE) used the models of lunar eclipse and solar eclipse in order to prove that the celestial bodies were round, not flat. This was an extension of the reasoning of Jing Fang and other theorists as early as the Han dynasty. In his Dream Pool Essays of 1088 CE, Shen related a conversation he had with the director of the Astronomical Observatory, who had asked Shen if the shapes of the Sun and the Moon were round like balls or flat like fans. Shen Kuo explained his reasoning for the former:

If they were like balls they would surely obstruct each other when they met. I replied that these celestial bodies were certainly like balls. How do we know this? By the waxing and waning of the moon. The moon itself gives forth no light, but is like a ball of silver; the light is the light of the sun (reflected). When the brightness is first seen, the sun (-light passes almost) alongside, so the side only is illuminated and looks like a crescent. When the sun gradually gets further away, the light shines slanting, and the moon is full, round like a bullet. If half of a sphere is covered with (white) powder and looked at from the side, the covered part will look like a crescent; if looked at from the front, it will appear round. Thus we know that the celestial bodies are spherical.

When he asked Shen Kuo why eclipses occurred only on an occasional basis while in conjunction and opposition once a month, Shen Kuo wrote:

I answered that the ecliptic and the moon's path are like two rings, lying one over the other, but distant by a small amount. (If this obliquity did not exist), the sun would be eclipsed whenever the two bodies were in conjunction, and the moon would be eclipsed whenever they were exactly in opposition. But (in fact) though they may occupy the same degree, the two paths are not (always) near (each other), and so naturally, the bodies do not (intrude) upon one another.

== Equipment and innovation ==
=== Armillary sphere (渾儀) ===
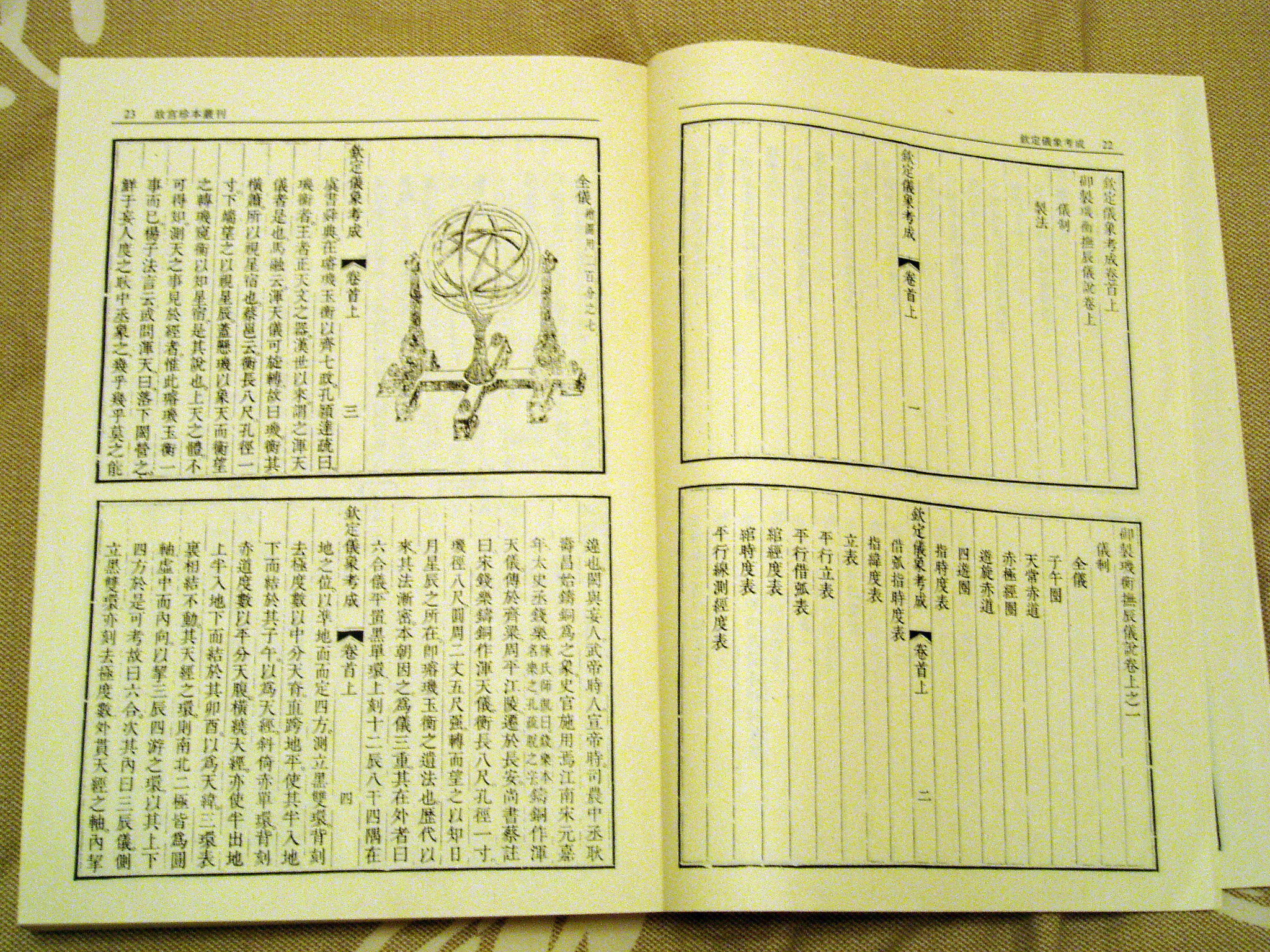
A method of making observation instruments at the time of the Qing dynasty

The earliest development of the armillary sphere in China goes back to the 1st century BCE, as they were equipped with a primitive single-ring armillary instrument. This would have allowed them to measure the north polar distance (去極度, the Chinese form of declination) and measurement that gave the position in a hsiu (入宿度, the Chinese form of right ascension).

During the Western Han dynasty (202 BCE–9 CE), additional developments made by the astronomers Luoxia Hong (落下閎), Xianyu Wangren (鮮于妄人), and Geng Shouchang (耿壽昌) advanced the use of the armillary in its early stage of evolution. In 52 BCE, it was the astronomer Geng Shou-chang who introduced the fixed equatorial ring to the armillary sphere. In the subsequent Eastern Han dynasty (23–220 CE) period, the astronomers Fu An and Jia Kui added the elliptical ring by 84 CE. With the famous statesman, astronomer, and inventor Zhang Heng (78–139 CE), the sphere was totally completed in 125 CE, with horizon and meridian rings. The world's first hydraulic (i.e., water-powered) armillary sphere was created by Zhang Heng, who operated his by use of an inflow clepsydra clock (see Zhang's article for more detail).

=== Abridged armilla (簡儀) ===
Designed by famous astronomer Guo Shoujing in 1276 CE, it solved most problems found in armillary spheres at that time. The primary structure of abridged armilla contains two large rings that are perpendicular to each other, of which one is parallel with the equatorial plane and is accordingly called "equatorial ring", and the other is a double ring that is perpendicular to the center of the equatorial ring, revolving around a metallic shaft, and is called "right ascension double ring". The double ring holds within itself a sighting tube with crosshairs. When observing, astronomers would aim at the star with the sighting tube, whereupon the star's position could be deciphered by observing the dials of the equatorial ring and the right ascension double ring. A foreign missionary melted the instrument in 1715 CE. The surviving one was built in 1437 CE and was taken to what is now Germany. It was then stored in a French Embassy in 1900, during the Eight-Nation Alliance. Under the pressure of international public discontent, Germany returned the instrument to China. In 1933, it was placed in Purple Mountain Observatory, which prevented it from being destroyed in the Japanese invasion of China. In the 1980s, it had become seriously eroded and rusted down and was nearly destroyed. In order to restore the device, the Nanjing government spent 11 months to repair it.

=== Celestial globe (渾象) before the Qing dynasty ===
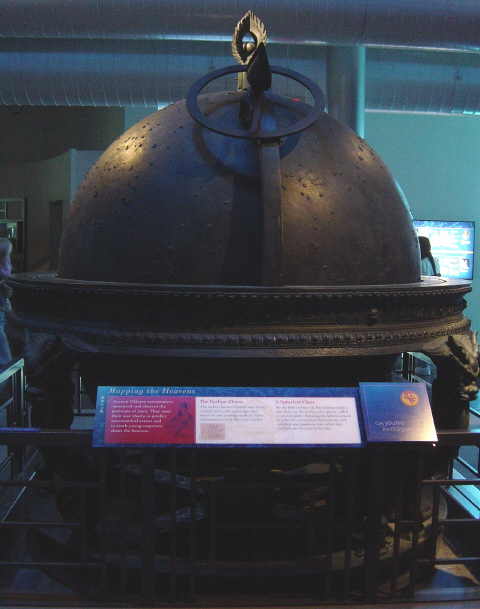
Celestial globe from the Qing dynasty

Besides star maps, the Chinese also made celestial globes, which show stars' positions like a star map and can present the sky at a specific time. Because of its Chinese name, it is often confused with the armillary sphere, which is just one word different in Chinese (渾象 vs. 渾儀). According to records, the first celestial globe was made by Geng Shou-chang (耿壽昌) between 70 BCE and 50 BCE. In the Ming dynasty, the celestial globe at that time was a huge globe, showing the 28 mansions, celestial equator, and ecliptic. None of them have survived.

=== Celestial globe (天體儀) in the Qing dynasty ===
Celestial globes were named 天體儀 ("Miriam celestial bodies") in the Qing dynasty. The one in Beijing Ancient Observatory was made by Belgian missionary Ferdinand Verbiest (南懷仁) in 1673 CE. Unlike other Chinese celestial globes, it employs 360 degrees rather than the 365.24 degrees (which is a standard in ancient China). It is also the first Chinese globe that shows constellations near to the Celestial South Pole.

=== The water-powered armillary sphere and celestial globe tower (水運儀象台) ===
The inventor of the hydraulic-powered armillary sphere was Zhang Heng (78–139 CE) of the Han dynasty. Zhang was well-known for his brilliant applications of mechanical gears, as this was one of his most impressive inventions (alongside his seismograph to detect the cardinal direction of earthquakes that struck hundreds of miles away).

Started by Su Song (蘇頌) and his colleagues in 1086 CE and finished in 1092 CE, his large astronomical clock tower featured an armillary sphere (渾儀), a celestial globe (渾象), and a mechanical chronograph. It was operated by an escapement mechanism and the earliest known chain drive. However, 35 years later, the invading Jurchen army dismantled the tower in 1127 CE upon taking the capital of Kaifeng. The armillary sphere part was brought to Beijing, yet the tower was never successfully reinstated, not even by Su Song's son. Fortunately, two versions of Su Song's treatise, written on his clock tower, have survived the ages, so that studying his astronomical clock tower is made possible through medieval texts.

=== True north and planetary motion ===
The polymath Chinese scientist Shen Kuo (1031–1095 CE) was not only the first in history to describe the magnetic-needle compass, but also made a more accurate measurement of the distance between the pole star and true north that could be used for navigation. Shen achieved this by making nightly astronomical observations, along with his colleague Wei Pu, using Shen's improved design of a wider sighting tube that could be fixed to observe the pole star indefinitely. Along with the pole star, Shen Kuo and Wei Pu also established a project of nightly astronomical observation over a period of five successive years, an intensive work that would even rival the later work of Tycho Brahe in Europe. Shen Kuo and Wei Pu charted the exact coordinates of the planets on a star map for this project and created theories of planetary motion, including retrograde motion.

== Foreign influences ==
=== Indian astronomy ===
Buddhism first reached China during the Eastern Han dynasty, and translation of Indian works on astronomy came to China by the Three Kingdoms era (220–265 CE). However, the most detailed incorporation of Indian astronomy occurred only during the Tang dynasty (618–907), when a number of Chinese scholars—such as Yi Xing—were versed in both types of astronomy. A system of Indian astronomy was recorded in China as Jiuzhi-li (718 CE), the author of which was an Indian by the name of Qutan Xida.

The astronomical table of sines by the Indian astronomer and mathematician Aryabhata was translated into the Chinese astronomical and mathematical book Treatise on Astrology of the Kaiyuan Era (Kaiyuan Zhanjing), compiled in 718 CE, during the Tang dynasty. The Kaiyuan Zhanjing was compiled by Gautama Siddha, an astronomer and astrologer born in Chang'an, and whose family was originally from India. He was also notable for his translation of the Navagraha calendar into Chinese.

The Chinese translations of the following works are mentioned in the Sui Shu, or Official History of the Sui dynasty (seventh century):

- Po-lo-men Thien Wen Ching (Brahminical Astronomical Classic) in 21 books.
- Po-lo-men Chieh-Chhieh Hsien-jen Thien Wen Shuo (Astronomical Theories of Brahman;a Chieh-Chhieh Hsienjen) in 30 books.
- Po-lo-men Thien Ching (Brahminical Heavenly Theory) in one book.
- Mo-teng-Chia Ching Huang-thu (Map of Heaven and Earth in the Matangi Sutra) in one book.
- Po-lo-men Suan Ching (Brahminical Arithmetical Classic) in three books.
- Po-lo-men Suan Fa (Brahminical Arithmetical Rules) in one book.
- Po-lo-men Ying Yang Suan Ching (Brahminical Method of Calculating Time)

Although these translations are lost, they were also mentioned in other sources.

=== Islamic astronomy in East Asia ===
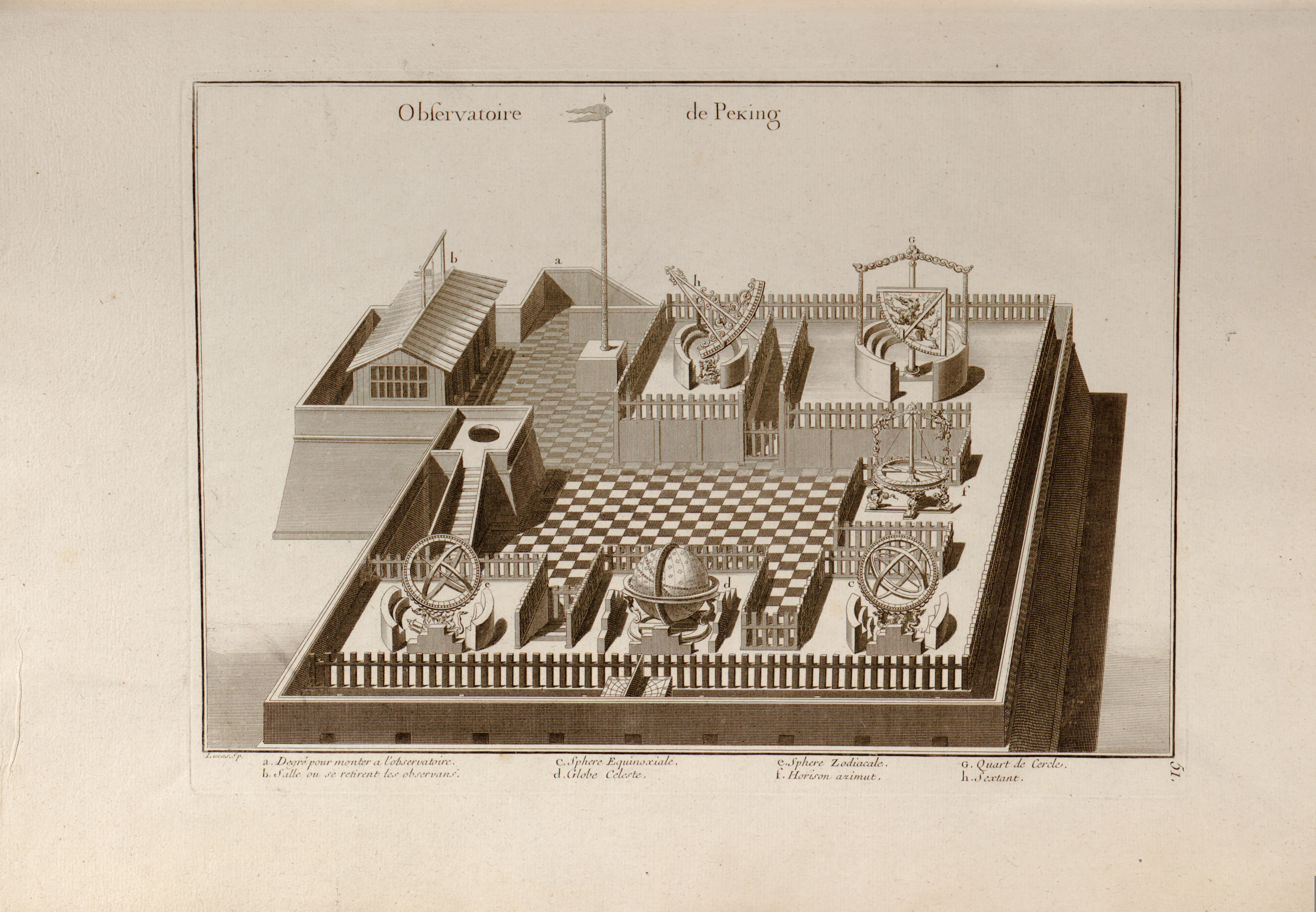
Early European drawing of the Beijing Ancient Observatory.

Islamic influence on Chinese astronomy was first recorded during the Song dynasty, when a Hui Muslim astronomer named Ma Yize introduced the concept of 7 days in a week and made other contributions.

Islamic astronomers were brought to China in order to work on calendar-making and astronomy during the Mongol Empire and the succeeding Yuan dynasty. The Chinese scholar Yelü Chucai accompanied Genghis Khan to Persia in 1210 and studied their calendar for use in the Mongol Empire. Kublai Khan brought Iranians to Beijing to construct an observatory and an institution for astronomical studies.

Several Chinese astronomers worked at the Maragheh observatory, founded by Nasir al-Din al-Tusi in 1259 under the patronage of Hulagu Khan in Persia. One of these Chinese astronomers was Fu Mengchi, or Fu Mezhai.

In 1267, the Persian astronomer Jamal ad-Din, who previously worked at Maragha observatory, presented Kublai Khan with seven Persian astronomical instruments, including a terrestrial globe and an armillary sphere, as well as an astronomical almanac, which was later known in China as the Wannian Li ("Ten Thousand Year Calendar" or "Eternal Calendar"). He was known as "Zhama Luding" in China, where, in 1271, he was appointed by the Khan as the first director of the Islamic observatory in Beijing, known as the Islamic Astronomical Bureau, which operated alongside the Chinese Astronomical Bureau for four centuries. Islamic astronomy gained a good reputation in China for its theory of planetary latitudes, which did not exist in Chinese astronomy at the time, and for its accurate prediction of eclipses.

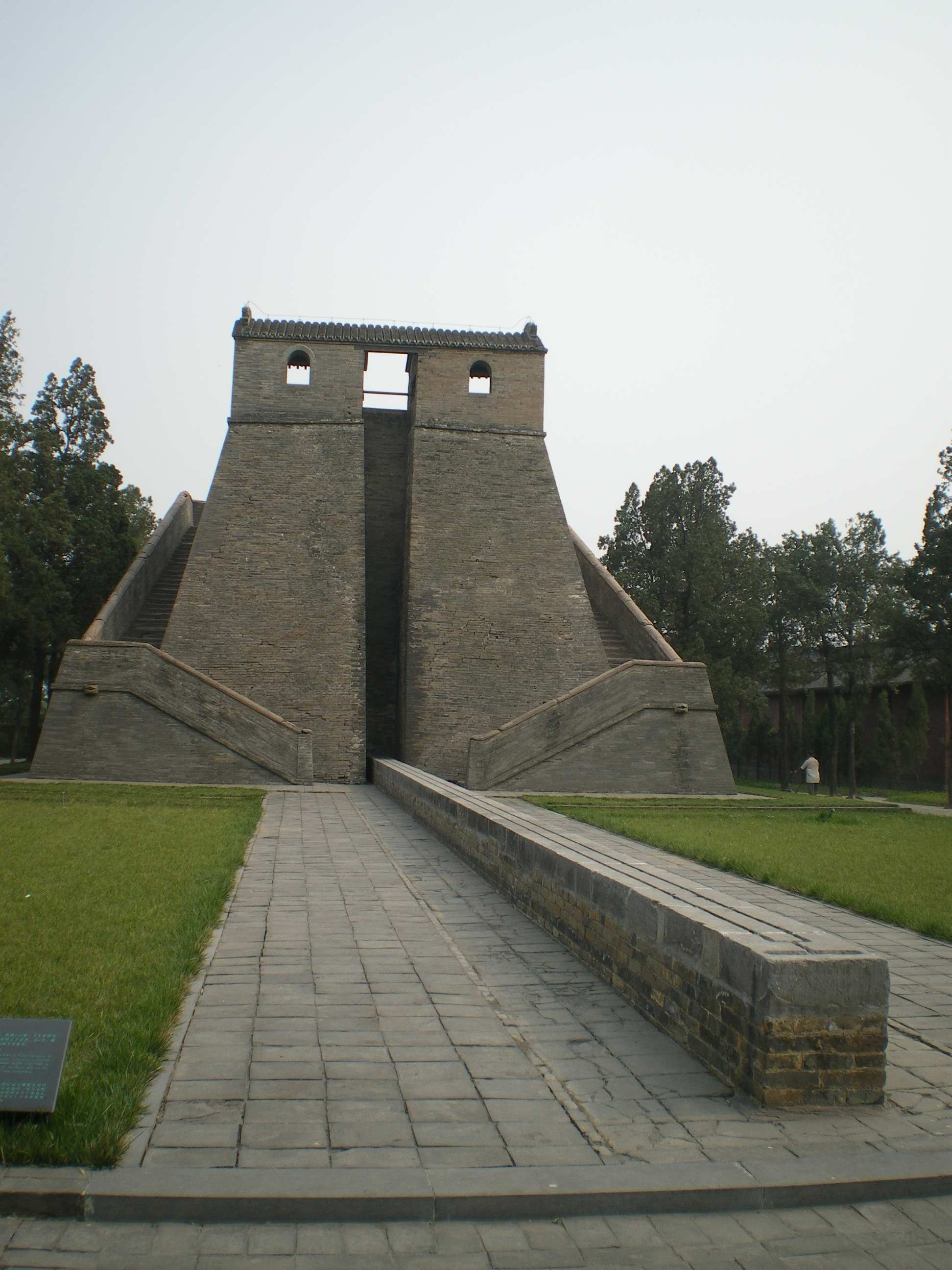
Gaocheng Astronomical Observatory built in 1276.

Some of the astronomical instruments constructed by the famous Chinese astronomer Guo Shoujing shortly afterwards resemble the style of instrumentation built at Maragheh. In particular, the "simplified instrument" (jianyi) and the large gnomon at the Gaocheng Astronomical Observatory show traces of Islamic influence. While formulating the Shoushili calendar in 1281, Shoujing's work in spherical trigonometry may have also been partially influenced by Islamic mathematics, which was largely accepted at Kublai's court. These possible influences include a pseudo-geometrical method for converting between equatorial and ecliptic coordinates, the systematic use of decimals in the underlying parameters, and the application of cubic interpolation in the calculation of the irregularity in the planetary motions. Emperor Taizu (r. 1368–1398) of the Ming dynasty (1328–1398), in the first year of his reign (1368), conscripted Han and non-Han astrology specialists from the astronomical institutions in Beijing of the former Mongolian Yuan to Nanjing to become officials of the newly established national observatory. That year, the Ming government summoned, for the first time, the astronomical officials to come south from the upper capital of Yuan. There were fourteen of them. In order to enhance accuracy in methods of observation and computation, Emperor Taizu reinforced the adoption of parallel calendar systems, the Han and the Hui. In the following years, the Ming Court appointed several Hui astrologers to hold high positions in the Imperial Observatory. They wrote many books on Islamic astronomy and also manufactured astronomical equipment based on the Islamic system. The translation of two important works into Chinese was completed in 1383: Zij (1366) and al-Madkhal fi Sina'at Ahkam al-Nujum, Introduction to Astrology (1004). In 1384, a Chinese astrolabe was made for observing stars based on the instructions for making multi-purposed Islamic equipment. In 1385, the apparatus was installed on a hill in northern Nanjing. Around 1384, during the Ming dynasty, Emperor Zhu Yuanzhang ordered the Chinese translation and compilation of Islamic astronomical tables, a task that was carried out by the scholars Mashayihei, a Muslim astronomer, and Wu Bozong, a Chinese scholar-official. These tables came to be known as the Huihui Lifa (Muslim System of Calendrical Astronomy), which was published in China a number of times until the early 18th century, though the Qing dynasty had officially abandoned the tradition of Chinese-Islamic astronomy in 1659. The Muslim astronomer Yang Guangxian was known for his attacks on the Jesuit's astronomical sciences.

=== Jesuit activity in China ===
Early-modern European science was introduced into China by Jesuit priest astronomers as part of their missionary efforts, in the late sixteenth century and early seventeenth century.

The telescope was introduced to China in the early seventeenth century. The telescope was first mentioned in Chinese writing by Manuel Dias the Younger (Yang Manuo), who wrote his Tian Wen Lüe in 1615. In 1626, Johann Adam Schall von Bell (Tang Ruowang) published the Chinese treatise on the telescope known as the Yuan Jing Shuo (The Far-Seeing Optic Glass). The Chongzhen Emperor (r 1627–1644) of the Ming dynasty acquired the telescope of Johannes Terrentius (or Johann Schreck; Deng Yu-han) in 1634, ten years before the collapse of the Ming dynasty. However, the impact on Chinese astronomy was limited.

The Jesuit China missions of the sixteenth and seventeenth centuries brought Western astronomy, then undergoing its own revolution, to China and—via João Rodrigues's gifts to Jeong Duwon—to Joseon Korea. After the Galileo affair early in the seventeenth century, the Roman Catholic Jesuit order was required to adhere to geocentrism and ignore the heliocentric teachings of Copernicus and his followers, even though they were becoming standard in European astronomy. Thus, the Jesuits initially shared an Earth-centered and largely pre-Copernican astronomy with their Chinese hosts (i.e., the Ptolemaic-Aristotelian views from Hellenistic times). The Jesuits (such as Giacomo Rho) later introduced Tycho's geoheliocentric model as the standard cosmological model. The Chinese often were fundamentally opposed to this as well, since the Chinese had long believed (from the ancient doctrine of Xuan Ye) that the celestial bodies floated in a void of infinite space. This contradicted the Aristotelian view of solid concentric crystalline spheres, where there was not a void, but a mass of air between the heavenly bodies.

Of course, the views of Copernicus, Galileo, and Tycho Brahe would eventually triumph in European science, and these ideas slowly leaked into China despite Jesuit efforts to curb them in the beginning. In 1627, the Polish Jesuit Michael Boym (Bu Mige) introduced Johannes Kepler's Copernican Rudolphine Tables, with much enthusiasm, to the Ming court at Beijing. In Adam Schall von Bell's Chinese-written treatise of Western astronomy in 1640, the names of Copernicus (Ge-Bai-Ni), Galileo (Jia-li-lüe), and Tycho Brahe (Di-gu) were formally introduced to China. There were also Jesuits in China who were in favor of the Copernican theory, such as Nicholas Smogulecki and Wenceslaus Kirwitzer. However, Copernican views were not widespread or wholly accepted in China during this time.

Ferdinand Augustin Hallerstein (Liu Songling) created the first spherical astrolabe as the Head of the Imperial Astronomical Bureau from 1739 until 1774. The former Beijing Astronomical observatory, now a museum, still hosts the armillary sphere with rotating rings, which was made under Hallerstein's leadership, and is considered the most prominent astronomical instrument.

While in Edo Japan, the Dutch aided the Japanese with the first modern observatory of Japan in 1725, headed by Nakane Genkei, whose observatory of astronomers wholly accepted the Copernican view. In contrast, the Copernican view was not accepted in mainstream China until the early nineteenth century, with the Protestant missionaries such as Joseph Edkins, Alex Wylie, and John Fryer.

== Astronomy during Ming China ==
The Ming dynasty in China lasted from 1368 until 1644 and experienced a decrease in astronomical expansion. The occupation of astronomer during these times relied less on discovery and more on the use of astronomy. Astronomers worked in the two Astronomical Bureaus, both of which underwent many changes throughout the years since their formation. The path into the occupation was hereditary; because of the rigidity and high level of intelligence needed for this occupation, children of astronomers were banned from pursuing other professions.

=== Astronomical Bureaus ===
When transitioning into the Ming dynasty, the two largest institutions of astronomy were the Traditional Chinese Astronomical Bureau (also named T’ai-shih-chien), which had been established in the third century BC, and the Muslim Astronomical Bureau (also named Hui-hui ssu-t’ien-chien), which had been previously established by the Mongols. Both sectors worked together, until the Muslim Bureau was absorbed in 1370 by the Traditional Chinese Bureau. When the merge occurred, the overall name of the new bureau became Ch’in-t’ien-chien. To accommodate the influx of new workers, the ranking system within the occupation also transitioned. There became one Director, supported by two Deputy Directors, followed by a Registrar with four seasonal Chiefs. Then came eight Chief Astronomers, five Chief Diviners, two Chiefs of the Clepsydras, and three Observers. Following that was two Calendar Officials, eight Observers of Sunrise, and six Professors of the Clepsydra.

=== Responsibilities of the Bureau ===
Some of the roles astronomers played in Ming China were to make calendars, report abnormalities to the emperor, and preside over ceremonies. As calendar makers and people who understand the heavens, the Bureau also decided what days were auspicious and good for different events such as military parades, marriage, construction, and more. The astronomers also used astronomy to predict invasions or dangerous moments within the empire. However, records indicate that the majority of work the Astronomical Bureaus did was simply recording the movements of the stars and planets.

In regards to the specific jobs each position does, the Chief Officials of the Five Agencies would fix the calendar and the time of the seasons, along with the Calendar Officials and Astronomers. However, the Chief Astronomer observes the positions of the sun, moon, and planets to make notes regarding what might be an abnormality. The Chief Diviner specializes in analyzing the astronomical abnormalities. The Chief Clepsydra Officer looks after the CLepsydra, along with the Clepsydra professor, who then tell the Sunrise Announcer when sunrise and sunset would occur.

=== Colleagues ===
The Astronomical Bureaus worked closely with The Ministry of Rites. The bureau submitted monthly ordinances, planetary and celestial locations, and seasonal accounts within the calendar to the Ministry. The Ministry also helped train children of astronomers for their future jobs and helped select outsiders in certain cases, but not specifying from where they draw these candidates. The Bureaus were also in close contact with the Emperor, and he often read the reports sent by the Bureau to the Ministry.

=== Training ===
Because becoming an astronomer was a hereditary profession, and those that are employed by the Bureau are not transferable to other occupations, students were trained very young by the Ministry of Rites. However, when there was a shortage of workers in the Bureau, the Ministry of Rites would scout suitable students and train them on a trial basis. Calendrical recordings greatly attracted Confucian scholars, which widened interest into this subject, and thus, into astronomy and divination. Confucian students' deep need for knowledge and practicality made these tasks appeal to academics. Astronomy was attractive because it blended the physical world with larger implications. However, astronomy was considered part of the "small dao", a title used to attempt to discourage Confucian scholars from studying subjects that, while interesting at first, could eventually bog them down.

=== Payment ===
Within the Bureau, payment was decided upon by rank. As established in the year 1392, the top rank of Director was paid sixteen piculs of rice per month. The Deputy Directors and Chiefs of the Five Agencies were allotted ten piculs per month, the Astronomers received seven piculs, while both the Registrars and Chief Diviners had six-and-a-half piculs. The Chiefs of the Clepsydras received six piculs, and the Calendar Officers and Observers both had five-and-a-half piculs. The lowest payment level went to the Observers of the Sunrise and the Professors of the Clepsydras, at five piculs per month.

=== Instruments Used by the Occupation ===
==== Memorial ====
The memorial was used by astronomers as a record keeper of anomalies, as the heavens are demonstrative of the effect of the ruler's actions. Originally, authors signed each contribution individually but that was eventually replaced by the official seal of the astronomical bureau.

==== Imperial Observatory ====
The imperial observatory was a platform where the observations were made. It was first located just south of Nanjing, but later moved to Jiming Mountain city. However, in 1402 there was another platform created in the capital of Beijing.

==== Armillary Sphere (Ming China) ====
The armillary sphere has three sets of rings that represent the celestial sphere. The first group contains fixed meridian, horizon, and equatorial rings. The second group contains ecliptic, solstitial, and equinoctial rings that turn as a unit. The inner group contains one meridian ring that moves around the celestial pole. These allow the astronomer to set a celestial object within their sights and judge distance.

==== The Simplified Instrument ====
The simplified instrument serves a very similar purpose to the armillary sphere but has fewer parts. With only two sets of coordinates, this instrument has a larger range and vision than the armillary spheres.

==== Yuan Gnomon ====
The Yuan Gnomon is a shadow casting instrument used to measure the position of the sun. However, it does not appear to be very accurate. A crucial aspect of this mechanism was that it was oriented along the north–south meridian line, which allowed it to show the local noon. While not included in the 1392 list of official instruments, in 1437 Huangfu Zhonghe included it, likely due less to its practicality and more to the ingenuity behind it.

==== Clepsydra ====
The clepsydra, or water clock, was the most prevalent of time-keeping devices for astronomers. The clepsydra was also used as the official state time-keeping device. The Astronomical Bureau used a three-chamber-intake clepsydra, although there is no record of a water clock at Nanjing. It was not until the Bureau moved to Beijing that an official water hall was observed.

=== Outside perspective ===
Because of the ideological importance of astronomy regarding politics, and the lack of precision by the instruments, many people believed the observations were false. Other recorded corruption, such as accepting bribery, stealing, and not being punctual, were also experienced. This led to a strict policy of punishment if the astronomers were found to be corrupt. Punishments included such actions as dismissal, deprivation of salary, or even beatings.

== Famous Chinese astronomers ==
- Gan De (4th century BCE)
- Shi Shen (4th century BCE)
- Zhang Heng (78 – 139 CE)
- Yu Xi (307 – 345 CE)
- Shen Kuo (1031 – 1095 CE)
- Su Song (1020 – 1101 CE)
- Guo Shoujing (1231 – 1316 CE)
- Xu Guangqi (1562 – 1633 CE)
- Wang Xishan (1628 – 1682)

== Observatory ==
- Beijing Ancient Observatory
- Astro Observatory

== See also ==
- Book of Silk
- Chinese astrology
- Chinese constellations
- Chu Silk Manuscript
- Flat Earth in China
- History of astronomy
- Timeline of Chinese astronomy
- Traditional Chinese star names
