= Timeline of Chinese astronomy =

This is a timeline of Chinese records and investigations in astronomy.

- 2137 BC - October 22, the Chinese book the Book of Documents, records the earliest known solar eclipse (乃季秋月朔，辰弗集于房).
- c. 2000 BC - Chinese determine that Jupiter's orbital period is 12 years.
- c. 1400 BC - Chinese record the regularity of solar and lunar eclipses and the earliest known solar prominence and two novas (七日己巳夕有新大星并火，辛未酉殳新星).
- c. 1200 BC - Chinese divide the sky into twenty-eight regions (Chinese constellations) for recognition of the stars.
- c. 1100 BC - Chinese first determine the spring equinox.
- 776 BC - Chinese make the earliest reliable record of a solar eclipse.
- 613 BC - In July, a comet, possibly Comet Halley, is recorded in the Spring and Autumn Annals (秋七月，有星孛入于北斗).
- 532 BC - A nova was recorded in the Records of the Grand Historian and Zuo Zhuan (周景王十三年春，有星出婺女).
- 364 BC - Earliest recorded observation of sunspots made by Gan De.
- 28 BC - May 10, Chinese imperial history book, the Book of Han, makes earliest known dated record of sunspots; systematic Chinese observations of sunspots continue thereafter.
- 185 - The earliest recorded supernova of RCW 86
- 687 - Chinese make earliest known record of meteor shower.
- 1054 - July 4, Chinese astronomers noted the appearance of a guest star, the supernova which produced the Crab Nebula, Messier's M1.
- 1088 - In his Dream Pool Essays, the polymath Chinese scientist Shen Kuo (1031–1095) wrote of his findings for the improved meridian measurement between the pole star and true north, which was an invaluable concept for aiding navigation by use of the magnetic compass. Shen Kuo also argued for spherical celestial bodies by using evidence of lunar eclipses and solar eclipses, which promoted the spherical Earth theory and went against the flat Earth theory.

== See also ==
- History of astronomy
