= List of solar eclipses in antiquity =

This is a list of selected solar eclipses from antiquity, in particular those with historical significance. Eclipses on this list were not only recorded, but sometimes would have large effects, such as ending a war.

== Historically significant solar eclipses ==
| Date of eclipse | Type | Saros | Magnitude | Gamma | Time (UTC) | | | Central Duration | Eclipse Path | Notes |
| Date of eclipse | Type | Saros | Magnitude | Gamma | Start | Mid | End | Central Duration | Eclipse Path | Notes |
|---|---|---|---|---|---|---|---|---|---|---|
| October 22, 2137 BC | Annular | 9 | 0.9736 | 0.3842 | 00:37:34.0 | 03:25:29.2 | 06:13:24.2 | 02m51.6s | China | Two ancient Chinese astronomers, named Hsi and Ho, were said to have been executed for failing to predict this eclipse. |
| June 24, 1312 BC | Total | 35 | 1.03172 | 0.26192 | 08:46:32.3 | 10:30:58.3 | 12:15:18.9 | 04m33s | Anatolia | Known as Mursili's eclipse, could provide an absolute chronology of the ancient Near East. |
| 21 Apr 899 BC | Annular | 53 | 0.9591 | 0.8964 | | 22:21:56 | | 03m04s | | China's 'Double-Dawn' Eclipse |
| June 15, 763 BC | Total | 44 | | | | 08:23 | | 04m59s | | Attested in Assyrian sources and providing an absolute chronology of the ancient Near East. |
| 6 Apr 648 BC | Total | 38 | 1.0689 | 0.6898 | | 08:31:03 | | 05min02s | | Archilochus' Eclipse |
| May 28, 585 BC | Total | 57 | | | | 14:28 | | 06m05s | | Allegedly predicted by Thales; occurred during a battle between the Lydians and Medes. |
| February 17, 478 BC or October 2, 480 BC | Annular | 42/65 | | | | 9:58:51/11:51:0 | | 06m00s/07m57s | Greece | Eclipse occurring before Xerxes' first march against Greece. The exact dating has been debated, as the writings of Herodotus (who chronicled the eclipse) give a date for which there was no eclipse visible in that area of the world. |
| August 3, 431 BC | Annular | 48 | | | | 14:54:51:8 | | 01m04.5s | Greece, Mediterranean Sea | Recorded by Thucydides; Pericles shows his Greek Army that the eclipse was not much more than a covering of the sun by something bigger than his cloak. |
| May 6, 319 | Total | 72 | | | | 14:24:49 | | 03m56s | Georgia, Europe, Mexico, United States | Thought by astronomers to be the eclipse preceding the Christianization of Iberia by Mirian III of Iberia. |
| July 17, 334 | Annular | 80 | 0.9759 | 0.3268 | | 11:21:41 | | 02m23s | Rome, Mediterranean Sea | Recorded by Firmicus Maternus in his Mathesos. |

== Statistics ==
=== Longest total eclipses ===
Below is a list of the 10 longest total eclipses between the 30th century BC and the 4th century.

| Date of eclipse | Central Duration | Reference |
|---|---|---|
| 30 May 2585 BC | 07m17s | |
| 10 June 2567 BC | 07m21s | |
| 6 May 2249 BC | 07m20s | |
| 17 May 2231 BC | 07m21s | |
| 5 June 762 BC | 07m25s | |
| 15 June 744 BC | 07m28s | |
| 26 June 726 BC | 07m18s | |
| 16 June 345 | 07m17s | |
| 27 June 363 | 07m24s | |
| 8 July 381 | 07m22s | |

=== Solar eclipses by century ===
| Century | No. | Eclipse type | | | | Longest eclipse (Note: All eclipses listed are annular. See § Longest total eclipses above for longest total eclipses) | | Two-eclipse months (Note: Months listed in this column had two eclipses occur during that time period) | Ref. |
| Century | No. | Partial (P) | Annular (A) | Total (T) | Hybrid (H) | Length | Date | Two-eclipse months | Ref. |
|---|---|---|---|---|---|---|---|---|---|
| 20th BC | 239 | 84 | 71 | 62 | 22 | 11m38s | 28 December 1983 BC | March 1958 BC | |
| 19th BC | 253 | 93 | 80 | 63 | 17 | 08m57s | 28 October 1896 BC | January 1806 BC | |
| 18th BC | 254 | 95 | 74 | 64 | 21 | 11m10s | 10 November 1710 BC | | |
| 17th BC | 230 | 75 | 71 | 60 | 24 | 12m07s | 12 December 1656 BC | July 1611 BC | |
| 16th BC | 225 | 78 | 67 | 59 | 21 | 10m07s | 25 January 1583 BC | June 1535 BC, May 1524 BC | |
| 15th BC | 226 | 77 | 69 | 62 | 18 | 10m00s | 25 September 1410 BC | April 1448 BC | |
| 14th BC | 234 | 76 | 84 | 68 | 6 | 11m29s | 18 November 1320 BC | | |
| 13th BC | 250 | 93 | 86 | 64 | 7 | 11m11s | 9 December 1284 BC | December 1210 BC | |
| 12th BC | 252 | 93 | 89 | 63 | 7 | 10m27s | 14 December 1108 BC | October 1123 BC, September 1112 BC | |
| 11th BC | 238 | 79 | 91 | 68 | 0 | 10m34s | 25 December 1090 BC | August 1036 BC, July 1025 BC, June 1014 BC | |
| 10th BC | 226 | 84 | 75 | 61 | 6 | 09m01s | 24 October 984 BC | | |
| 9th BC | 225 | 80 | 75 | 66 | 4 | 10m21s | 7 November 817 BC | | |
| 8th BC | 234 | 79 | 88 | 64 | 3 | 11m29s | 10 December 763 BC | | |
| 7th BC | 253 | 96 | 87 | 63 | 7 | 10m06s | 22 November 604 BC | December 689 BC, November 678 BC, October 602 BC | |
| 6th BC | 255 | 96 | 86 | 65 | 8 | 10m50s | 4 January 531 BC | September 591 BC, August 515 BC, July 504 BC | |
| 5th BC | 241 | 84 | 78 | 62 | 17 | 10m24s | 26 January 495 BC | May 417 BC | |
| 4th BC | 225 | 83 | 63 | 56 | 23 | 10m16s | 7 December 391 BC | | |
| 3rd BC | 226 | 83 | 62 | 57 | 24 | 11m47s | 30 November 214 BC | | |
| 2nd BC | 237 | 80 | 73 | 63 | 21 | 12m08s | 22 December 178 BC | | |
| 1st BC | 251 | 92 | 77 | 65 | 17 | 08m51s | 14 February 87 BC | | |
| 1st AD | 248 | 90 | 75 | 58 | 25 | 11m18s | 4 November 96 | August 7, July 18, April 97 | |
| 2nd AD | 237 | 80 | 77 | 64 | 16 | 12m23s (Note: This is the longest annular eclipse in the five millennia between the 20th century BC and 30th century.) | 7 December 150 | | |
| 3rd AD | 227 | 79 | 74 | 69 | 5 | 11m09s | 8 January 205 | | |
| 4th AD | 222 | 73 | 76 | 66 | 7 | 10m44s | 2 January 363 | | |
