= Chen Zhuo =

3rd-century Chinese Eastern Wu astronomer

- Traditional Chinese: 陳卓
- Simplified Chinese: 陈卓
Transcriptions
Standard Mandarin
- Hanyu Pinyin: Chén Zhuó

Chen Zhuo (fl. 3rd century) was a Chinese astronomer who lived in the Three Kingdoms period (220–280) of China. He served as an imperial astronomer in the state of Eastern Wu (222–280). He collected the works of earlier astronomers of the Han dynasty and combined them into a single system. His star catalogue listed 1,464 stars in 283 constellations. His works were lost over the course of history, but information on his system of constellations survives in Tang dynasty records, notably by Qutan Xida.
