= Wang Xishan =

Chinese astronomer and mathematician

Wang Xishan (pinyin: Wáng xī chǎn; Wade–Giles: Wang Hsi-shan; 23 July 1628 – 18 October 1682) was a Chinese astronomer, almanac maker, and mathematician who developed an independent cosmological view based on ideas from western astronomy and mathematics. He lived during the late Ming and early Qing dynasties and published several manuscript works that have survived.

Wang was the son of Wang Beizhen and was born in Suzhou. He was self taught and was said to be unimpressive in his appearance and made a living by teaching. He also had some wealthy patrons. The Chinese court of the Ming Dynasty had an astronomical bureau that included Jesuits who brought in knowledge of western astronomy and were involved in introducing calendar reforms. Wang began to study the motions of the stars, and planets using numerical approaches demonstrated in western teaching along with other scholars like Mei Wending and Xue Fengzuo. However, western ideas were not adopted wholesale. For example, while interested in Euclid, Wang found his discourses on deductive logic irrelevant to astronomy. In order to increase acceptability of their approaches, they invented the idea that these techniques had originated in China and had then been taken up from there by western scholars. In 1663 Wang produced tables to help calculating ephemerides, eclipses and solar transits of Venus and Mercury. In 1673 he published on the movements of the planets which considered moving spheres and forces acting on the planets from the outer periphery of these spheres. He divided a circle into 384 divisions rather than the 360 used in western instruments.
