= Solar eclipse of October 22, 2137 BC =

Annular solar eclipse

- Annular eclipse
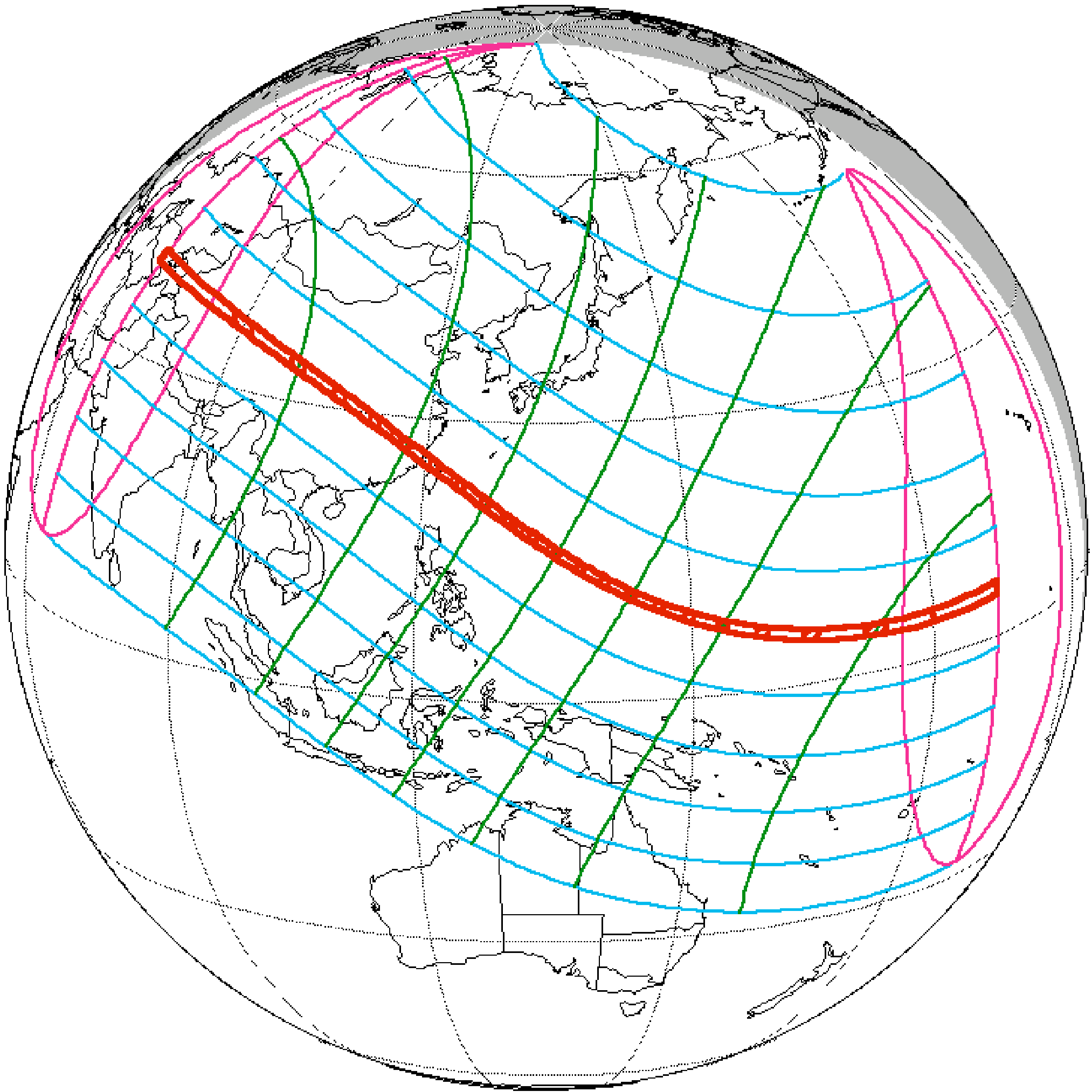
- Solar eclipse of October 22, 2137 BC
- Gamma: 0.3842
- Magnitude: 0.9736

Maximum eclipse
- Duration: 171.6 s (2m 51.6s)
- Coordinates: 16.7°N 134.3°E
- Max. width of band: 101.7 km

Times (UTC)
- (P1) Partial begin: 00:37:34.0
- (U1) Total begin: 01:41:29.8
- (U2) Central begin: 01:44:22.7
- Greatest eclipse: 03:25:29.2
- (U3) Central end: 05:06:47.9
- (U4) Total end: 05:09:34.6
- (P4) Partial end: 06:13:24.2

References
- Saros: 9 (25 of 74)

An annular solar eclipse occurred at the Moon's ascending node of orbit on October 22, 2137 BC, with a magnitude of 0.9736. A solar eclipse occurs when the Moon passes between the Earth and Sun, completely or partially blocking the Sun for a viewer on Earth. An annular solar eclipse occurs when the Moon's apparent diameter is smaller than that of the Sun, blocking most of the Sun's light and causing it to appear as an annulus (ring). An annular eclipse also appears as a partial eclipse over a region thousands of kilometers wide.

The annular eclipse was visible in modern-day Kyrgyzstan, Tajikistan, China, and Taiwan. A partial eclipse was visible over much of northern, central and eastern Asia and Oceania.

== Observations ==
A widely reported anecdote about this eclipse, one of the earliest recorded in history, found in the Book of Documents, involves two Chinese court astronomers, named Hsi and Ho (Xi and He using Pinyin). They are supposed to have failed to predict the eclipse and warn the emperor, who was Zhong Kang at the time, or conduct the proper eclipse ceremonies, because they were drinking, resulting in their executions.

A short poem referencing the tale reads:

Here lie the bodies of Ho and Hi
Whose fate though sad was visible,
Being hanged because they could not spy
Th'eclipse which was invisible.

Heigh ho! 'tis said, that being drunk
Thus brought them into trouble,
But surely this is incorrect,
As drunken folks see double!

However, other sources dispute their execution, reporting that they had taken part in a rebellion many years after the eclipse. In addition, certain sources claim there was only one astronomer, Hsi-Ho, who was also a powerful tribe leader, and the eclipse may have been an excuse to eliminate him. The story's authenticity has further been questioned altogether, stating that the names of the astronomers may have instead referred instead to the solar deity Xihe.

Another attestation of this eclipse, also in the Book of Documents, records that “[a]t the 1st day (new moon) in late fall (the 8th month), the Sun and Moon could not live peacefully together in the sky.”

=== The date ===
The date of October 22, 2137 BC was proposed by Theodor von Oppolzer for the eclipse recorded in the Book of Documents. Other historically proposed dates include May 7, 2165 BC, May 12, 1905 BC, 2110 BC, and 2159 BC. However, the 2137 BC date is best because the eclipse was recorded as occurring in the Chinese constellation of the Room (Fang), corresponding to part of modern-day Scorpius, and is thus the only eclipse corresponding to both the location of observation and the location of the Sun in the sky at the time.

== Eclipse details ==
Below are some tables displaying technical details of this eclipse. The left table outlines specific times of contact the Moon's shadow made with the Earth, and the right details the parameters associated with the eclipse.

| Event | Time (UTC) |
|---|---|
| First penumbral external contact | 00:37:34.0 |
| First umbral external contact | 01:41:29.8 |
| First umbral internal contact | 01:44:22.7 |
| First penumbral internal contact | 03:01:54.3 |
| Greatest eclipse | 03:25:29.2 |
| Ecliptic conjunction | 03:29:44.8 |
| Last penumbral internal contact | 03:49:28.0 |
| Last umbral internal contact | 05:06:47.9 |
| Last umbral external contact | 05:09:34.6 |
| Last penumbral external contact | 06:13:24.2 |

| Parameter | Value |
|---|---|
| Magnitude | 0.9736 |
| Gamma | 0.3842 |
| Sun right ascension | 12^{h} 44^{m} 42.1^{s} |
| Sun declination | −04° 55′ 04.3″ |
| Sun semi-diameter | 00°16'16.3" |
| Sun equatorial horizontal parallax | 00°00'08.9" |
| Moon right ascension | 12^{h} 45^{m} 09.0^{s} |
| Moon declination | −04° 34′ 09.9″ |
| Moon semi-diameter | 00°15'36.7" |
| Moon equatorial horizontal parallax | 00°57'17.6" |
| ΔT | 49822.9 s |

== Eclipse season ==
This eclipse is part of an eclipse season, a period of around 6 months during which eclipses can occur. Two or three eclipse seasons can occur each year. Each season lasts about 35 days and repeats 173 days later, therefore, at least two full eclipse seasons must occur each year. Two to three eclipses occur each eclipse season, separated by a fortnight.

Eclipse season of October 2137 BC
| October 7 Descending node (full moon) | October 22 Ascending node (new moon) |
|---|---|
| Penumbral lunar eclipse Lunar Saros -17 | Annular solar eclipse Solar Saros 9 |

== Related eclipses ==
=== Eclipses in 2137 BC ===
- A penumbral lunar eclipse on April 13.
- A total solar eclipse on April 27.
- A penumbral lunar eclipse on May 13.
- A penumbral lunar eclipse on October 7.
- An annular solar eclipse on October 22.

=== Metonic ===
- Preceded by: Solar eclipse of October 22, 2156 BC
- Followed by: Solar eclipse of October 23, 2118 BC

=== Tzolkinex ===
- Preceded by: Solar eclipse of September 10, 2144 BC
- Followed by: Solar eclipse of December 4, 2128 BC

=== Half-Saros ===
- Preceded by: Lunar eclipse of October 17, 2146 BC
- Followed by: Lunar eclipse of October 27, 2128 BC

=== Tritos ===
- Preceded by: Solar eclipse of November 22, 2148 BC
- Followed by: Solar eclipse of September 21, 2126 BC

=== Solar Saros 9 ===
- Preceded by: Solar eclipse of October 12, 2155 BC
- Followed by: Solar eclipse of November 3, 2119 BC

=== Inex ===
This eclipse is a member of inex series 27.

- Preceded by: Solar eclipse of November 12, 2166 BC
- Followed by: Solar eclipse of October 1, 2107 BC

=== Triad ===
- Preceded by: Solar eclipse of December 23, 2224 BC
- Followed by: Solar eclipse of August 23, 2050 BC

=== Solar eclipses of 2139 BC–2133 BC ===
This eclipse is a part of a semester series. Eclipses in a semester series of solar eclipses repeat approximately every 177 days and 4 hours, a period referred to as a semester, at alternating nodes of the Moon's orbit.

The partial eclipse of June 19, 2139 BC and the total eclipse of March 8, 2135 BC are part of a different semester series.

Solar eclipse series sets from 2139 BC to 2133 BC
| Descending node | | | Ascending node | | |
| Saros | Date | Gamma | Saros | Map | Gamma |
| -16 | May 20, 2139 BC | 1.4685 | -11 | November 13, 2139 BC | -0.9674 |
| -6 | May 9, 2138 BC | 0.7218 | -1 | November 3, 2138 BC | -0.3162 |
| 4 | April 27, 2137 BC | -0.0694 | 9 | October 22, 2137 BC | 0.3842 |
| 14 | April 17, 2136 BC | -0.8277 | 19 | October 11, 2136 BC | 1.1154 |
| 24 | April 6, 2135 BC | -1.5196 | | | |

=== Saros 9 ===
This eclipse is a member of Solar Saros 9, which repeats every 18 years 11 days 8 hours at the ascending node of the Moon's orbit. The series began with a partial solar eclipse on February 6, 2569 BC. It contained total eclipses from May 13, 2407 BC to July 28, 2281 BC, hybrid eclipses from August 8, 2263 BC to August 30, 2227 BC, and annular eclipses from September 9, 2209 BC to August 10, 1650 BC. The series ended at member 74 as a partial eclipse on April 4, 1253 BC. The following eclipses are listed in three columns; every third eclipse is an exeligmos apart, so they occur at similar longitudes of the Earth.

The longest duration of totality was produced by member 12 at 2 minutes 31 seconds on June 4, 2371 BC and the longest duration of annularity was produced by member 50 at 7 minutes 48 seconds on July 20, 1686 BC.

Series members 25–48 occur between 2137 BC and 1722 BC:
| 25 | 26 | 27 |
|---|---|---|
| October 22, 2137 BC | November 3, 2119 BC | November 13, 2101 BC |
| 28 | 29 | 30 |
| November 24, 2083 BC | December 5, 2065 BC | December 16, 2047 BC |
| 31 | 32 | 33 |
| December 26, 2029 BC | January 7, 2010 BC | January 17, 1992 BC |
| 34 | 35 | 36 |
| January 28, 1974 BC | February 8, 1956 BC | February 19, 1938 BC |
| 37 | 38 | 39 |
| March 1, 1920 BC | March 3, 1902 BC | March 23, 1884 BC |
| 40 | 41 | 42 |
| April 3, 1866 BC | April 13, 1848 BC | April 25, 1830 BC |
| 43 | 44 | 45 |
| May 5, 1812 BC | May 16, 1794 BC | May 26, 1776 BC |
| 46 | 47 | 48 |
| June 7, 1758 BC | June 17, 1740 BC | June 28, 1722 BC |

== See also ==
- List of solar eclipses in antiquity
