= Luoxia Hong =

Chinese astronomer (c. 130–70 BCE)

- 落下閎
- Occupation: Astronomer
- Years active: c. 100 BCE

Luoxia Hong (Chinese: 落下閎, c. 130–70 BCE) was a Chinese astronomer during the Western Han dynasty. A well known astronomer from southwest China,

Hong was one of over twenty astronomers who traveled to Chang'an (now Xi'an) to propose a new calendar system for Emperor Wu.

It was common for Chinese emperors to introduce new calendars in order to place greater emphasis on heavenly bodies that were seen as particularly astrologically relevant to the particular ruler, but this reform was of such a scale that it was called the "Grand Inception" (太初) in contemporary documents.

The calendar made by Hong and his associate Deng Ping was accepted over that of other contestants, including several imperial astronomers. It included 12 months of 29 or 30 days, with an additional month in seven out of 19 years. It also included precise calculations for the movement of the sun, moon, planets, and the time of eclipses, which Hong was able to predict using an equatorial armillary sphere which he significantly improved, or possibly even invented.

The Tai Chu lunisolar calendar went into effect in 104 BCE, and remained substantially unchanged for nearly 2,000 years. Emperor Wu offered Hong an official position at court, but Hong declined and returned to solitary life.

== See also ==
- History of Chinese Calendars
- Chinese armillary spheres
- Yu Xi
- Zhang Heng
