= Star chart =

Map of the night sky

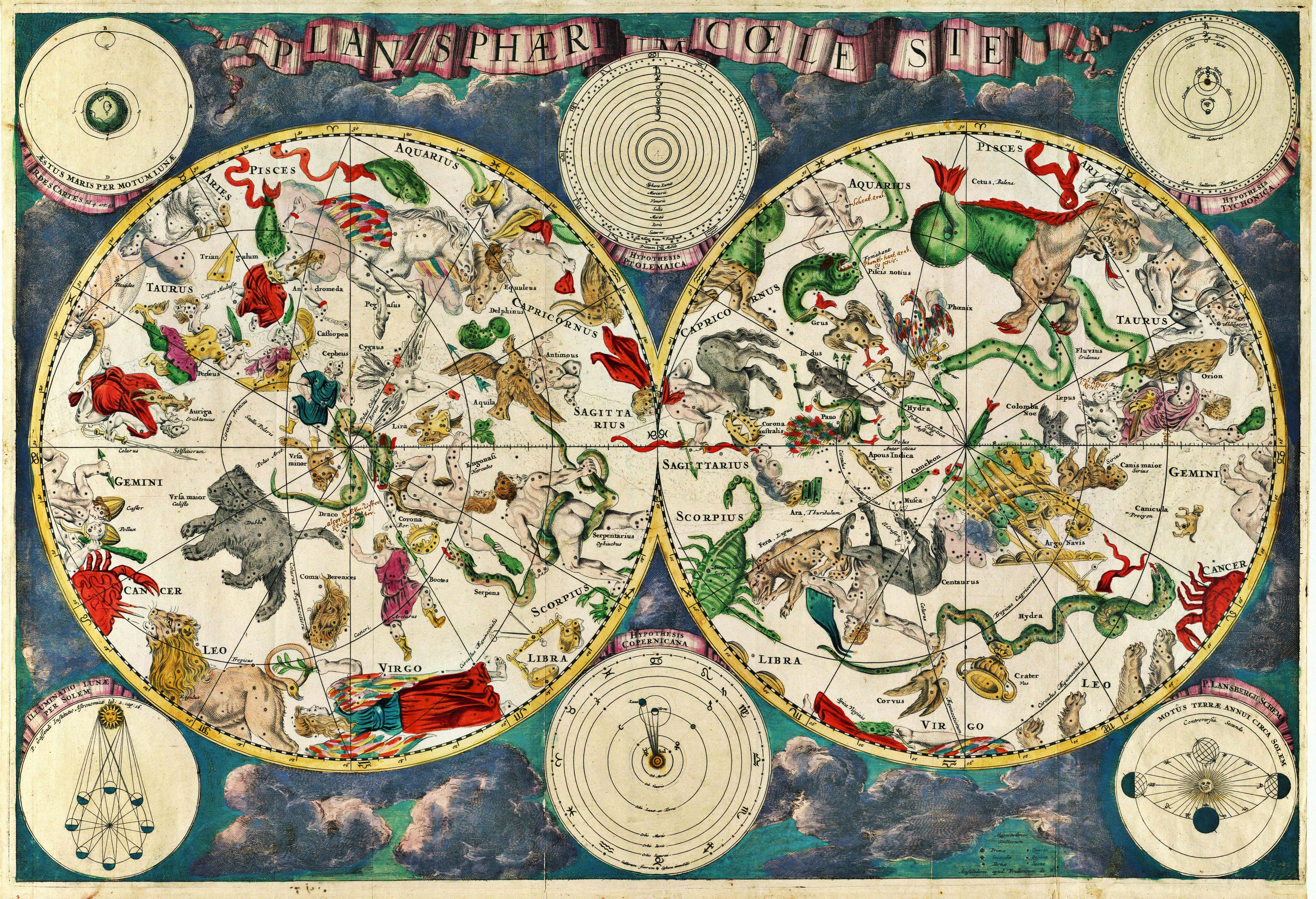
A celestial map by the Dutch cartographer Frederik de Wit, 1670

Constellation map 1845

A star chart is a celestial map of the night sky with astronomical objects laid out on a grid system. They are used to identify and locate constellations, stars, nebulae, galaxies, and planets. They have been used for human navigation since time immemorial. Note that a star chart differs from an astronomical catalog, which is a listing or tabulation of astronomical objects for a particular purpose. Tools using a star chart include the astrolabe and planisphere.

== History ==
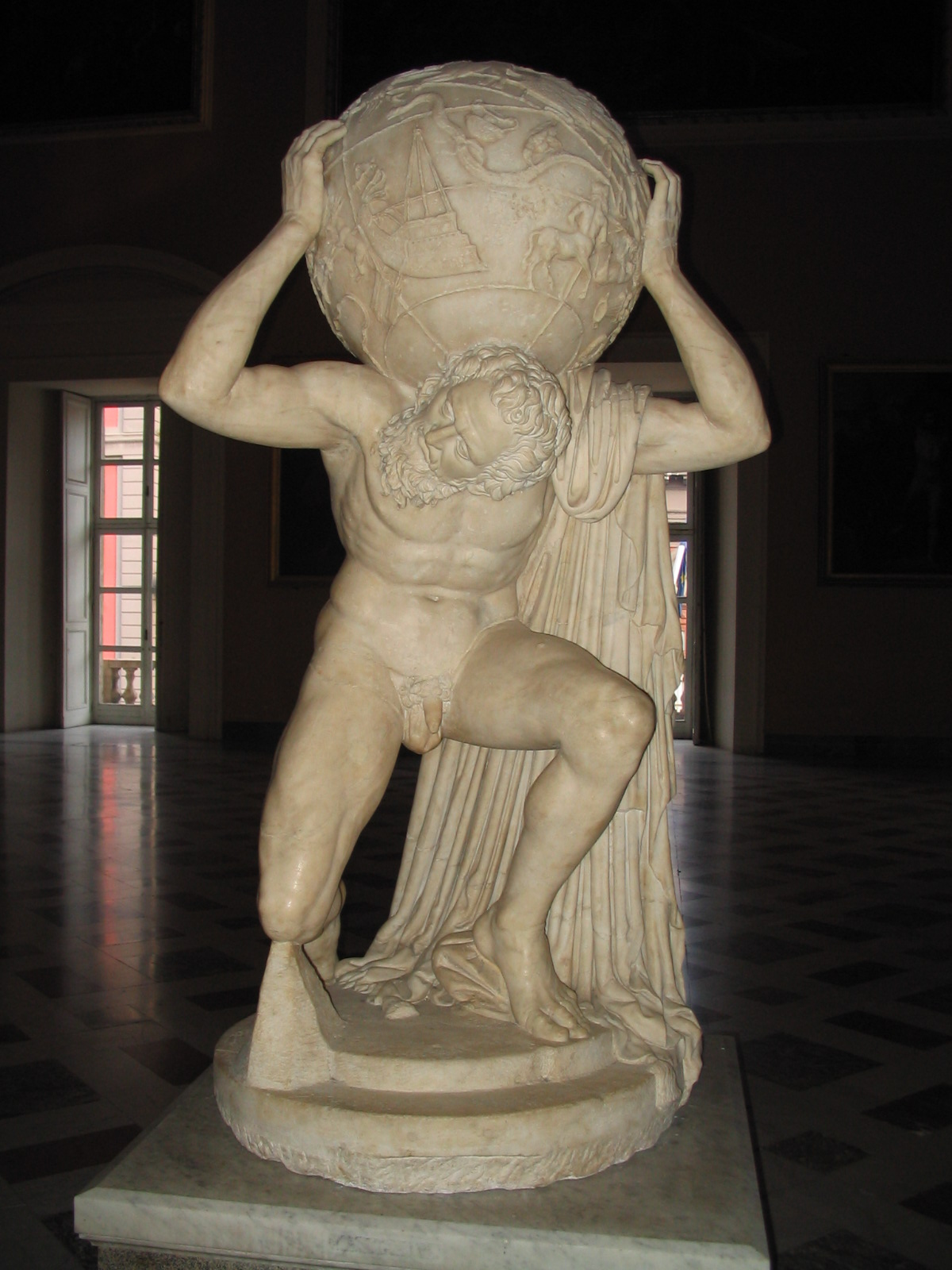
Farnese Atlas at the Museo Archeologico Nazionale, Naples

=== Prehistory ===
A variety of archaeological sites and artifacts found are thought to indicate ancient made star charts.

The oldest known star chart may be a carved ivory Mammoth tusk, drawn by early people from Asia who moved into Europe, that was discovered in Germany in 1979. This artifact is 32,500 years old and has a carving that resembles the constellation Orion, although it could not be confirmed and could also be a pregnancy chart.

German researcher Dr Michael Rappenglueck, of LMU Munich, has suggested that drawing on the wall of the Lascaux caves in France could be a graphical representation of the Pleiades open cluster of stars. This is dated from 33,000 to 10,000 years ago. He also suggested a panel in the same caves depicting a charging bison, a man with a bird's head and the head of a bird on top of a piece of wood, together may depict the Summer Triangle, which at the time was a circumpolar formation. Rappenglueck also discovered a drawing of the Northern Crown constellation in the cave of El Castillo (North of Spain), made in the same period as the Lascaux chart.

Another star chart panel, created more than 21,000 years ago, was found in the La Tête du Lion cave (fr). The bovine in this panel may represent the constellation Taurus, with a pattern representing the Pleiades just above it.

A star chart drawn 5000 years ago by the Indians in Kashmir, which also depict a supernova for the first time in human history. The Nebra sky disk, a 30 cm wide bronze disk dated to 1600 BC, bears gold symbols generally interpreted as a sun or full moon, a lunar crescent, several stars including the Pleiades cluster and possibly the Milky Way.

=== Antiquity ===
The oldest accurately dated star chart appeared in ancient Egyptian astronomy in 1534 BC. The earliest known star catalogues were compiled by the ancient Babylonian astronomers of Mesopotamia in the late 2nd millennium BC, during the Kassite Period (ca. 1531–1155 BC). The oldest records of Chinese astronomy date to the Warring States period (476–221 BC), but the earliest preserved Chinese star catalogues of astronomers Shi Shen and Gan De are found in the 2nd-century BC Shiji by the Western Han historian Sima Qian. The oldest Chinese graphical representation of the night sky is a lacquerware box from the 5th-century BC Tomb of Marquis Yi of Zeng, although this depiction shows the positions of the Chinese constellations by name and does not show individual stars.

The Farnese Atlas is a 2nd-century AD Roman copy of a Hellenistic era Greek statue depicting the Titan Atlas holding the celestial sphere on his shoulder. It is the oldest surviving depiction of the ancient Greek constellations, and includes grid circles that provide coordinate positions. Because of precession, the positions of the constellations slowly change over time. By comparing the positions of the 41 constellations against the grid circles, an accurate determination can be made of the epoch when the original observations were performed. Based upon this information, the constellations were catalogued at 125 ± 55 BC. This evidence indicates that the star catalogue of the 2nd-century BC Greek astronomer Hipparchus was used.

A Roman era example of a graphical representation of the night sky is the Ptolemaic Egyptian Dendera zodiac, dating from 50 BC. This is a bas relief sculpting on a ceiling at the Dendera Temple complex. It is a planisphere depicting the zodiac in graphical representations. However, individual stars are not plotted.

=== Medieval ===
The oldest surviving manuscript star chart was the Dunhuang Star Chart, dated to the Tang dynasty (618–907) and discovered in the Mogao Caves of Dunhuang in Gansu, Western China along the Silk Road. This is a scroll 210 cm in length and 24.4 cm wide showing the sky between declinations 40° south to 40° north in twelve panels, plus a thirteenth panel showing the northern circumpolar sky. A total of 1,345 stars are drawn, grouped into 257 asterisms. The date of this chart is uncertain, but is estimated as 705–10 AD.

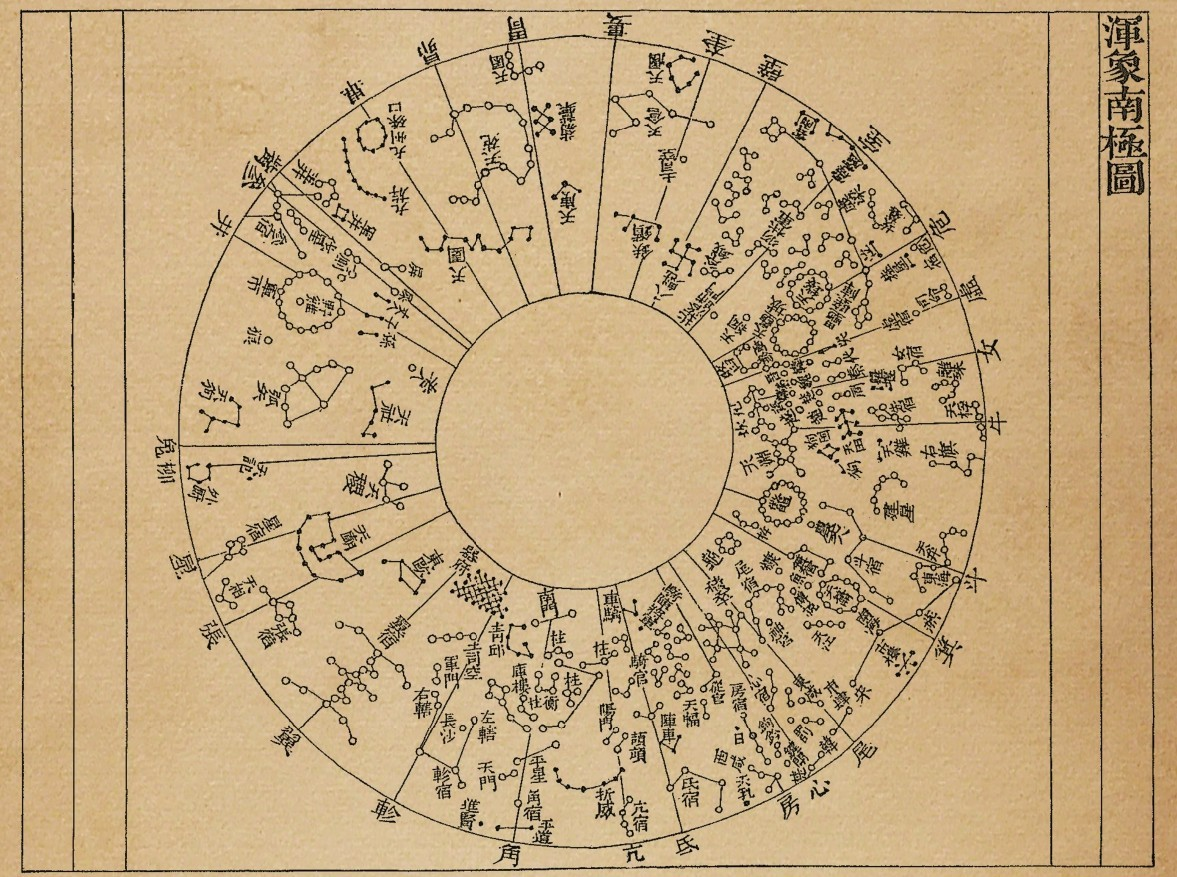
Star chart of the south polar projection for Chinese astronomer Su Song's (1020–1101) celestial globe.

During the Song dynasty (960–1279), the Chinese astronomer Su Song wrote a book titled Xin Yixiang Fa Yao (New Design for the Armillary Clock) containing five maps of 1,464 stars. This has been dated to 1092. In 1193, the astronomer Huang Shang prepared a planisphere along with explanatory text. It was engraved in stone in 1247, and this chart still exists in the Wen Miao temple in Suzhou.

In Muslim astronomy, the first star chart to be drawn accurately was most likely the illustrations produced by the Persian astronomer Abd al-Rahman al-Sufi in his 964 work titled Book of Fixed Stars. This book was an update of parts VII.5 and VIII.1 of the 2nd century Almagest star catalogue by Ptolemy. The work of al-Sufi contained illustrations of the constellations and portrayed the brighter stars as dots. The original book did not survive, but a copy from about 1009 is preserved at the Oxford University.

Perhaps the oldest European star map was a parchment manuscript titled De Composicione Spere Solide. It was most likely produced in Vienna, Austria in 1440 and consisted of a two-part map depicting the constellations of the northern celestial hemisphere and the ecliptic. This may have served as a prototype for the oldest European printed star chart, a 1515 set of woodcut portraits produced by Albrecht Dürer in Nuremberg, Germany.

=== Early modern ===
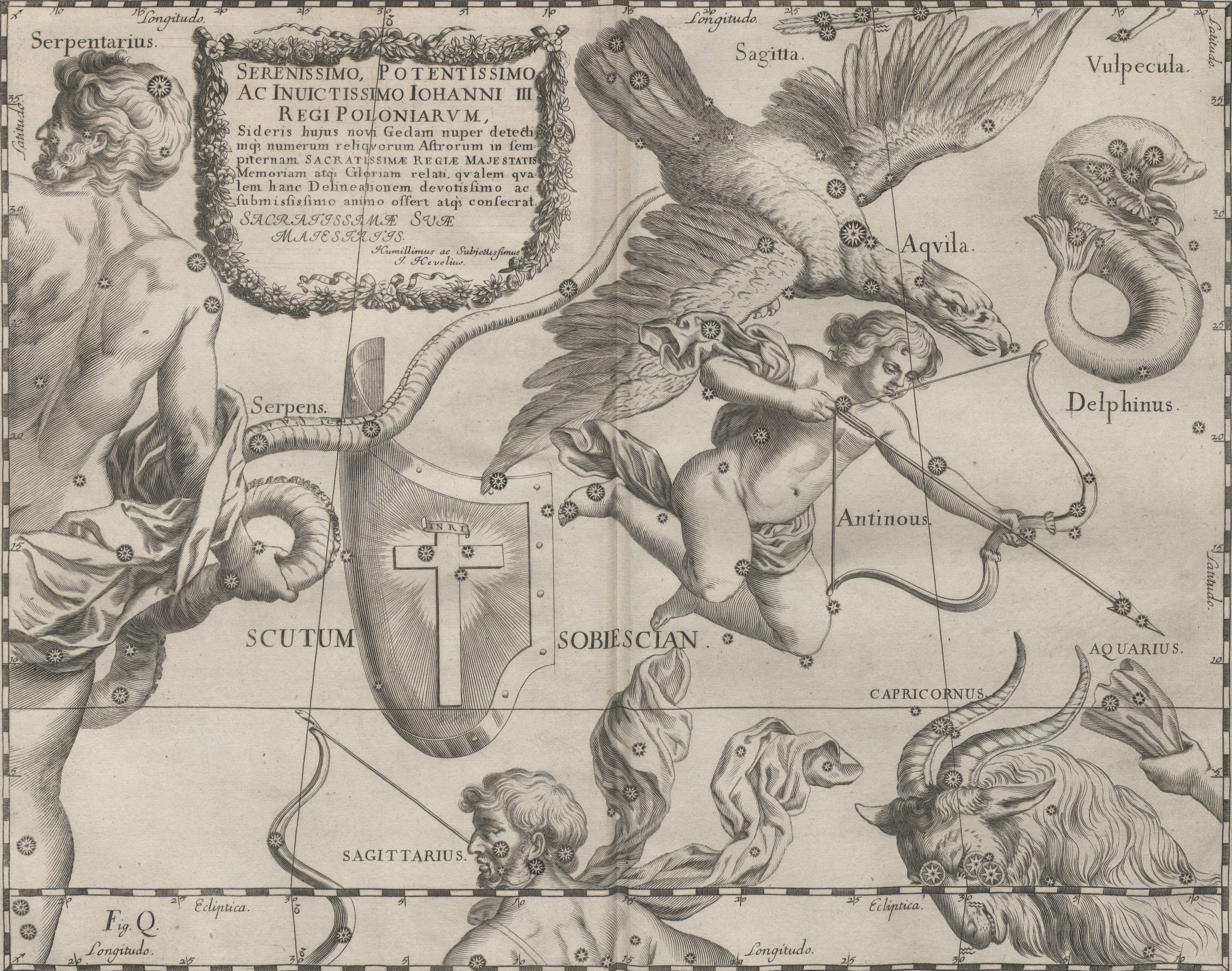
Hevelius – Firmamentum Sobiescianum sive Uranographia 1690

During the European Age of Discovery, expeditions to the southern hemisphere began to result in the addition of new constellations. These most likely came from the records of two Dutch sailors, Pieter Dirkszoon Keyser and Frederick de Houtman, who in 1595 traveled together to the Dutch East Indies. Their compilations resulted in the 1601 globe of Jodocus Hondius, who added 12 new southern constellations. Several other such maps were produced, including Johann Bayer's Uranometria in 1603. The latter was the first atlas to chart both celestial hemispheres and it introduced the Bayer designations for identifying the brightest stars using the Greek alphabet. The Uranometria contained 48 maps of Ptolemaic constellations, a plate of the southern constellations and two plates showing the entire northern and southern hemispheres in stereographic polar projection.

Polish astronomer Johannes Hevelius published his Firmamentum Sobiescianum star atlas posthumously in 1690. It contained 56 large, double page star maps and improved the accuracy in the position of the southern stars. He introduced 11 more constellations, including Scutum, Lacerta, and Canes Venatici.

=== Modern ===
In 1824 Sidney Hall produced a set of star charts called Urania's Mirror. They are illustrations based on Alexander Jamieson's A Celestial Atlas, but the addition of holes punched in them allowed them to be held up to a light to see a depiction of the constellation's stars.

== See also ==
- 88 modern constellations by area
- Astrology
- Cheonsang Yeolchabunyajido
- Ephemeris
- Lists of stars by constellation
- Magnitude (astronomy)
- Star cartography
- Timeline of astronomical maps, catalogs, and surveys
