= Chinese star maps =

Depictions of the positions of stars on the celestial sphere

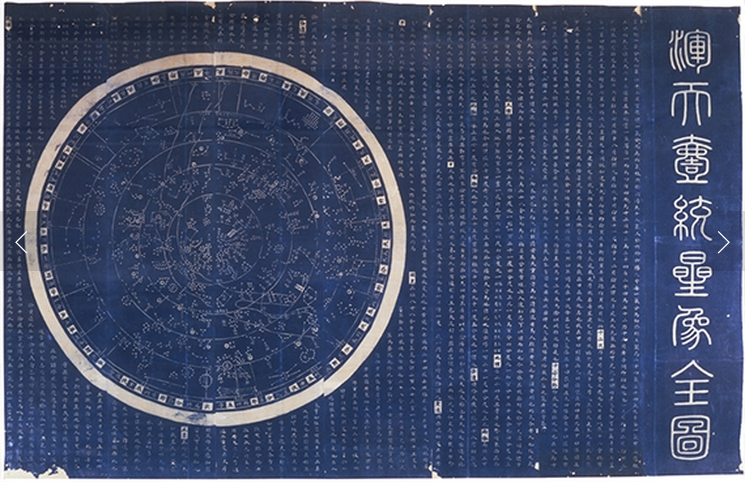
Rubbing of the Suchow star chart

Chinese star maps (simplified Chinese: 星图; traditional Chinese: 星圖; pinyin: xīngtú) are usually directional or graphical representations of Chinese astronomical alignments. Throughout the history of China, numerous star maps have been recorded. This page is intended to list or show the best available version of each star map. Star catalogs are also listed. For academic purposes, related star maps found in East Asia outside China are also listed.

== List of star maps ==
Map or catalog	Creator	Time created	Contents	links
M45 Fuxi Star Map (伏羲星图)		c. 4000 BC	Found on a mural in a Neolithic tomb in Xishuipo (西水坡), Puyang, Henan. Clam shells arranged in the shape of the Big Dipper in the North and below the foot, Tiger in the West and Azure Dragon in the East. Also showing Five Stars.	
Wu Xian Star Map (商巫咸星圖)	Wu Xian	c. 1000 BC	Contained 44 Central and Outer constellations totalling 141 stars	
Lacquer box from Tomb of Marquis Yi of Zeng		5th century BC	Indicated location of Big Dipper and 28 Constellations by characters	
Astronomic star observation (天文星占 Tianwen xingzhan)	Gan De	475-221 BC	Contained 75 Central Constellation and 42 Outer Constellations, some said 510 stars in 18 Constellations	
Shi Shen astronomy (石申天文 Shi Shen Tianwen) aka. (石氏星经 Shi Shi Xing Jing)	Shi Shen	c. 350 BC	138 Constellations and the name of 810 stars, location of 121 stars, some said it contains The 28 Lunar Ecliptic Constellations, 62 Central Constellations and 30 Outer Constellations	
Comet Diagrams from Mawangdui (彗星圖 Huixing Tu)		193 BC	29 different types of comets, also record and prediction of positions of Jupiter, Saturn, and Venus during 246–177 BC	-
Five Star Prediction Device (安徽阜陽五星候占儀)		168 BC	Also an Equatorial Device	
Equatorial Armillary Sphere (赤道式渾儀)	Luo Xiahong (落下閎)	104 BC	lost	reign of Emperor Wu of Han
Celestial Globe (渾象) (圓儀)	Geng Shouchang (耿壽昌)	52 BC	lost	
First Ecliptic Armillary Sphere (黄道仪 Huang Dao Yi)	Jia Kui (贾逵)	30–101 AD	-	-
Star chart from Western Han tomb mural in Luoyang (洛阳西汉墓壁画)		c. 1st century	Sun, Moon and ten other star charts	-
Han Dynasty Nanyang Stone Engraving (河南南阳汉石刻画) (行雨图 Xing Yu Tu)		c. 1st century	Depicted five stars forming a cross	-
Huntianyi seismometer (渾天儀)	Zhang Heng	117 AD	-	-
Sky Map (浑天图) and Hun Tian Yi Shuo (浑天仪说)	Lu Ji	187–219 AD	-	-
Reproduced Hun Tian Yi (浑天仪) and wrote Hun Tian Xiang Shuo (浑天象说)	Wang Fan	227–266 AD	-	-
Whole Sky Star Maps (全天星圖 Quan Tian Xing Tu)	Chen Zhuo (陳卓)	c. 270 AD	A Unified Constellation System. Star maps containing 1464 stars in 284 Constellations, written astrology text	-
Equatorial Armillary Sphere (渾儀 Hun Xi)	Kong Ting (孔挺)	323 AD	-	-
Northern Wei Period Iron Armillary Sphere (鐵渾儀)	Hu Lan (斛蘭)	436–440 AD		-
Southern Dynasties Period Whole Sky Planetarium (渾天象Hun Tian Xiang)	Qian Lezhi (錢樂之)	443 AD	Used red, black and white to differentiate stars from different star maps from Shi Shen, Gan De and Wu Xian	-
Northern Wei Grave Dome Star Map (河南洛陽北魏墓頂星圖)		526 AD	About 300 stars, including the Big Dipper, some stars are linked by straight lines to form constellation. The Milky Way is also shown.	-
Water-powered Planetarium (水力渾天儀)	Geng Xun (耿詢)	c. 7th century	-	-
Lingtai Miyuan (靈台秘苑)	Yu Jicai (庾季才) and Zhou Fen (周墳)	604 AD	incorporated star maps from different sources	-
Tang Dynasty Whole Sky Ecliptic Armillary Sphere (渾天黃道儀)	Li Chunfeng (李淳風)	667 AD	including Elliptic and Moon orbit, in addition to old equatorial design	-
The Dunhuang star map		705–710 AD	1,585 stars grouped into 257 clusters or "asterisms"	
Turfan Tomb Star Mural (新疆吐鲁番阿斯塔那天文壁画)		250–799 AD	28 Constellations, Milkyway and Five Stars	
Picture of Fuxi and Nüwa from the Astana Cemetery		Tang Dynasty	Picture of Fuxi and Nuwa together with some constellations	
Tang Dynasty Armillary Sphere (唐代渾儀Tang Dai Hun Xi) (黃道遊儀Huang dao you xi)	Yi Xing and Liang Lingzan	683–727 AD	based on Han Dynasty Celestial Globe, recalibrated locations of 150 stars, determined that stars are moving	-
Tang Dynasty Indian Horoscope Chart (梵天火羅九曜)	Yi Xing	683–727 AD	simple diagrams of the 28 Constellation	
Kitora Kofun 法隆寺 キトラ古墳 in Japan		c. late 7th century – early 8th century	Detailed whole sky map	
Treatise on Astrology of the Kaiyuan Era	Gautama Siddha	713 AD –	Collection of the three old star charts from Shi Shen, Gan De and Wu Xian. One of the most renowned collection recognized academically.	-
Big Dipper (山東嘉祥武梁寺石刻北斗星)		–	showing stars in Big Dipper	
Prajvalonisa Vjrabhairava Padvinasa-sri-dharani Scroll found in Japan 熾盛光佛頂大威德銷災吉祥陀羅尼經卷首扉畫		972 AD	Chinese 28 Constellations and Western Zodiac	-
Tangut Khara-Khoto Star Map (西夏黑水城星圖)		940 AD	A typical Qian Lezhi Style Star Map	-
Star Chart 五代吳越文穆王前元瓘墓石刻星象圖		941–960 AD	-	
Ancient Star Map 先天图	Chen Tuan	c. 11th century	Perhaps based on studying of Puyong Ancient Star Map	Lost
Song Dynasty Bronze Armillary Sphere 北宋至道銅渾儀	Han Xianfu (韓顯符)	1006	Similar to the Simplified Armillary by Kong Ting 孔挺, 晁崇 Chao Chong, 斛蘭 Hu Lan	-
Song Dynasty Bronze Armillary Sphere (北宋天文院黄道渾儀)	Shu Yijian (舒易簡), Yu Yuan (于渊), and Zhou Cong (周琮)	宋皇祐年中	Similar to the Armillary by Tang Dynasty Liang Lingzan and Yi Xing	-
Song Dynasty Armillary Sphere (北宋簡化渾儀)	Shen Kuo and Huangfu Yu (皇甫愈)	1089	Simplied version of Tang Dynasty Device, removed the rarely used moon orbit.	-
Five Star Charts (新儀象法要)	Su Song	1094	1464 stars grouped into 283 asterisms	
Song Dynasty Water-powered Planetarium (宋代 水运仪象台)	Su Song and Han Gonglian (韩公廉)	c. 11th century	-	
Liao Dynasty Tomb Dome Star Map (遼宣化张世卿墓頂星圖)		1116	shown both the Chinese 28 Constellation encircled by Babylonian Zodiac	
Star Map in a woman's grave (江西德安 南宋周氏墓星相图)		1127–1279	Milky Way and 57 other stars.	-
Suzhou Star Chart (蘇州石刻天文圖, 淳祐天文図)	Huang Shang (黃裳)	created in 1193, etched to stone in 1247 by Wang Zhiyuan (王致遠)	The chart shows 1434 Stars grouped into 280 asterisms; the accompanying text, supposedly a key to the chart, lists 1,565 stars in 283 asterisms.	
Yuan Dynasty Simplified Armillary Sphere 元代簡儀	Guo Shoujing	1276–1279	Further simplied version of Song Dynasty Device	
Japanese Star Chart (格子月進図)		1324	Similar to Su Song Star Chart, original burned in air raids during World War II, only pictures left. Reprinted in 1984 by Eiji Sasaki	-
天象列次分野之図(Cheonsang Yeolcha Bunyajido)		1395	Korean versions of Star Map in Stone. It was made in Chosun Dynasty and the constellation names were written in Chinese letter.	-
Japanese Star Chart 瀧谷寺 天之図		c. 14th or 15th centuries	-	-
Korean King Sejong's Armillary sphere		1433	-	
Star Chart	Mao Kun (茅坤)	c. 1422	Polaris compared with Southern Cross and Alpha Centauri	zh:郑和航海图
Ming Ancient Star Chart 北京隆福寺(古星圖)		c. 1453	1420 Stars, possibly based on old star maps from Tang Dynasty	-
Chanshu Star Chart (明常熟石刻天文圖)		1506	Based on Suzhou Star Chart, Northern Sky observed at 36.8 degrees North Latitude, 1466 stars grouped into 284 asterism	-
Ming Dynasty Star Map (渾蓋通憲圖說)	Matteo Ricci, recorded by Li Zhizao	c. 1550	-	
Tian Wun Tu (天问图)	Xiao Yuncong 萧云从	c. 1600	Contained mapping of 12 constellations and 12 animals	
Zhou Tian Xuan Ji Tu (周天璇玑图) and He He Si Xiang Tu (和合四象圖) in Xingming guizhi | by 尹真人高第弟子 published by 余永宁	1615	Drawings of Armillary Sphere and four Chinese Celestial Animals with some notes. Related to Taoism.	-	
Korean Astronomy Book "Selected and Systematized Astronomy Notes" 天文類抄		1623~1649	Contained some star maps	-
Ming Dynasty General Star Map (赤道南北兩總星圖)	Xu Guangqi and Adam Schall von Bell	1634	-	-
Ming Dynasty diagrams of Armillary spheres and Celestial Globes	Xu Guangqi	c. 1699	-	-
Ming Dynasty Planetarium Machine (渾象 Hui Xiang)		c. 17th century	Ecliptic, Equator, and dividers of 28 constellation	
Copper Plate Star Map stored in Korea		1652	-	-
Japanese Edo period Star Chart 天象列次之図	Harumi Shibukawa 渋川春海	1670	-	-
The Celestial Globe 天體儀	Ferdinand Verbiest	1673	1876 stars grouped into 282 asterisms	
Picture depicted Song Dynasty fictional astronomer (呉用 Wu Yong) with a Celestial Globe (天體儀)	Japanese painter	1675	showing top portion of a Celestial Globe	File:Chinese astronomer 1675.jpg
Japanese Edo period Star Chart 天文分野之図	Harumi Shibukawa	1677	-	
Japanese Edo period Star Chart 天文図解	井口常範	1689	-	-
Japanese Edo period Star Chart 古暦便覧備考	苗村丈伯	1692	-	-
Japanese star chart	Harumi Yasui	1699	A Japanese star chart of 1699 showing lunar stations	
Japanese Edo period Star Chart 天文成象Tian Wen Cheng xiang	渋川昔尹	1699	including Stars from Wu Shien (44 Constellation, 144 stars) in yellow; Gan De (118 Constellations, 511 stars) in black; Shi Shen (138 Constellations, 810 stars) in red and Harumi Shibukawa (61 Constellations, 308 stars) in blue;	
Japanese Star Chart 改正天文図説		unknown	Included stars from Harumi Shibukawa	
Korean Star Map Stone		c. 17th century	-	-
Korean Star Map		c. 17th century	-	-
Ceramic Ink Sink Cover		c. 17th century	Showing Big Dipper	
Korean Star Map Cube 方星圖	Philippus Maria Grimardi	c. early 18th century	-	-
Star Chart preserved in Japan based on a book from China 天経或問	You Ziliu 游子六	1730	A Northern Sky Chart in Chinese	-
Star Chart 清蒙文石刻(欽天監繪製天文圖) in Mongolia		1727–1732	1550 stars grouped into 270 starisms.	-
Japanese Edo period Star Chart 天経或問註解図巻 下	入江脩敬	1750	-	-
Reproduction of an ancient device 璇璣玉衡	Dai Zhen	1723–1777 AD	based on ancient record and his own interpretation	-
Rock Star Chart 清代天文石		c. 18th century	A Star Chart and general Astronomy Text	-
Korean Complete Star Map (渾天全圖)		c. 18th century	-	-
Qing Dynasty Star Catalog (儀象考成,仪象考成)恒星表 and Star Map 黄道南北両星総図	Yun Lu 允禄 and Ignaz Kögler	Device made in 1744, book completed in 1757	300 Constellations and 3083 Stars. Referenced Star Catalogue published by John Flamsteed	-
Jingban Tianwen Quantu	Ma Junliang 马俊良	1780–90	mapping nations to the sky	
Japanese Edo period Illustration of a Star Measuring Device 平天儀図解	岩橋善兵衛	1802	-	-
North Sky Map Huang Dao Zhong Xi He Tu (黄道中西合图)	Xu Choujun 徐朝俊	1807	More than 1000 stars and the 28 constellation	
Japanese Edo period Star Chart 天象総星之図	朝野北水	1814	-	-
Japanese Edo period Star Chart 新制天球星象記	田中政均	1815	-	-
Japanese Edo period Star Chart 天球図	坂部廣胖	1816	-	-
Chinese Star map	John Reeves esq	1819	Printed map showing Chinese names of stars and constellations	
Japanese Edo period Star Chart 昊天図説詳解	佐藤祐之	1824	-	-
Japanese Edo period Star Chart 星図歩天歌	小島好謙 and 鈴木世孝	1824	-	-
Japanese Edo period Star Chart	鈴木世孝	1824	-	-
Japanese Edo period Star Chart 天象管鈔 天体図 (天文星象図解)	長久保赤水	1824	-	
Japanese Edo period Star Measuring Device 中星儀	足立信順	1824	-	-
Japanese Star Map 天象一覧図 in Kanji	桜田虎門	1824	Printed map showing Chinese names of stars and constellations	-
Japanese Edo period Star Chart 方円星図, 方圓星図 and 増補分度星図方図	石坂常堅	1826	-	-
Japanese Star Chart	伊能忠誨	c. 19th century	-	-
Japanese Edo period Star Chart 天球図説	古筆源了材	1835	-	-
Qing Dynasty Star Catalog (儀象考成續編)星表		1844	Appendix to Yi Xian Kao Cheng, listed 3240 stars (added 163, removed 6)	
Stars map (恒星赤道経緯度図) stored in Japan		1844 or 1848	-	-
Japanese Edo period Star Chart 経緯簡儀用法	藤岡有貞	1845	-	-
Japanese Edo period Star Chart 分野星図	高塚福昌, 阿部比輔, 上条景弘	1849	-	-
Japanese Late Edo period Star Chart 天文図屏風	遠藤盛俊	late Edo Period	-	-
Japanese Star Chart 天体図	三浦梅園	-	-	-
Stars South of Equator, Stars North of Equator (赤道南恆星圖,赤道北恆星圖)		1875–1908	Similar to Ming Dynasty General Star Map	-
Fuxi 64 gua 28 xu wood carving 天水市卦台山伏羲六十四卦二十八宿全图		modern	-	-

== See also ==
- Chinese constellations
- Traditional Chinese star names
- Dunhuang Star Chart
