= Xi Zezong =

Chinese astronomer, historian, and translator

- Traditional Chinese: 席澤宗
- Simplified Chinese: 席泽宗
Transcriptions
Standard Mandarin
- Hanyu Pinyin: Xí Zézōng
- IPA: [ɕǐ tsɤ̌tsʊ́ŋ]

Xi Zezong (June 6, 1927 – December 27, 2008) was a Chinese astronomer, historian, and translator. He was a member of the Chinese Academy of Sciences and an awardee of the Astronomy Prize. He was born in Yuanqu County, Shanxi.

Xi Zezong identified a possible reference to one of the Galilean moons of Jupiter in the fragmentary ancient works of the 4th-century BC Chinese astronomer Gan De, who may have made observation of either Ganymede or Callisto in summer 365 BC.

He died in Beijing at age 81.

== Honors ==
Asteroid 85472 Xizezong, discovered by the Beijing Schmidt CCD Asteroid Program in 1997, was named in his honor. The official naming citation was published by the Minor Planet Center on April 2, 2007 (M.P.C. 59388).
