= Dunhuang Star Chart =

Star atlas from ancient Chinese astronomy, dated to the Tang dynasty (618–907)

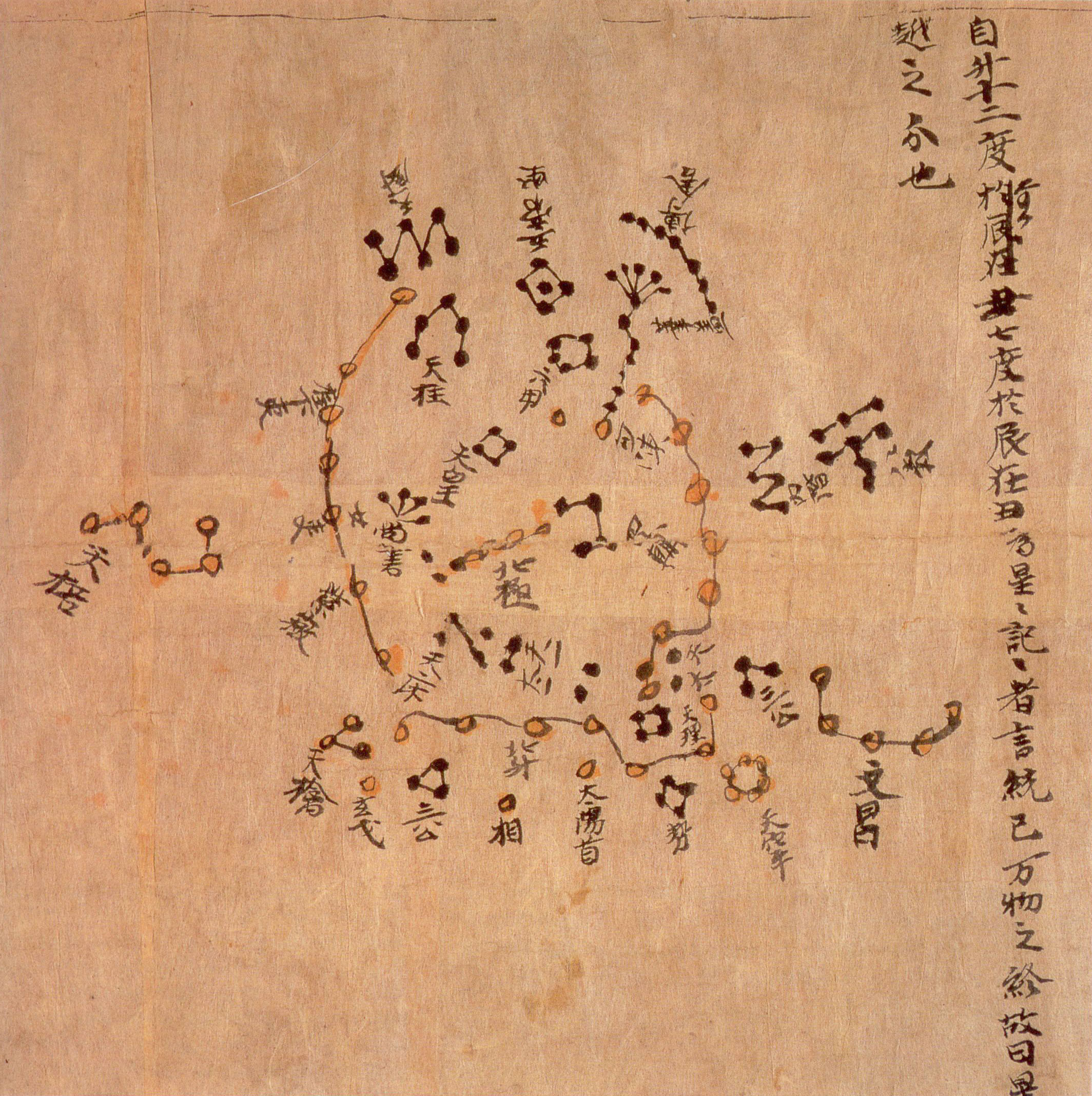
Detail of the Star Map from the Tang dynasty showing the North Polar region (British Library Or.8210/S.3326). This map was made around the year 700, around the reign of Emperor Zhongzong of Tang (705-710). Constellations of the three schools were distinguished with different colors: white, black and yellow for stars of Wu Xian, Gan De and Shi Shen respectively. The whole set of star maps contained 1,300 stars

The Dunhuang map or Dunhuang Star map is among the earliest known graphical depictions of the night sky in ancient Chinese astronomy, dating to the Tang dynasty (618–907). Prior to the discovery of this map, much of the star-related information recorded in early Chinese texts had been subject to speculations. The map provides visual corroboration of those textual records and forms part of a scroll that includes a series of illustrations found among the Dunhuang manuscripts. It is currently regarded as the world's oldest known complete star atlas.

The manuscript containing the star map was discovered in the early 20th century in the Mogao Caves and was taken along with hundreds of other manuscripts during a British expedition to Dunhuang. The scroll containing the Dunhuang map is currently held in the British Library.

The star map received its first major mention in Western academic literature in Joseph Needham’s Science and Civilisation in China (1959). Since then, scholarly studies of the chart have been limited.

== Colors ==
The symbols used to depict stars on the Dunhuang Star Map are categorized into three distinct groups, each corresponding to one of the traditional Chinese astronomical schools. These schools—known collectively as the "Three Schools of Astronomical Tradition"—are visually distinguished on the map through the use of three separate ink colors, allowing the viewer to differentiate the varying lineages and systems of celestial knowledge that coexisted during the period.

Each group reflects a specific strand of astronomical interpretation practiced in ancient China, representing the work of different court astronomers or regional traditions. This color-coded system not only organizes the stars and constellations according to these schools but also offers valuable insight into how astronomical knowledge was compiled, compared, and transmitted in Tang-era China.

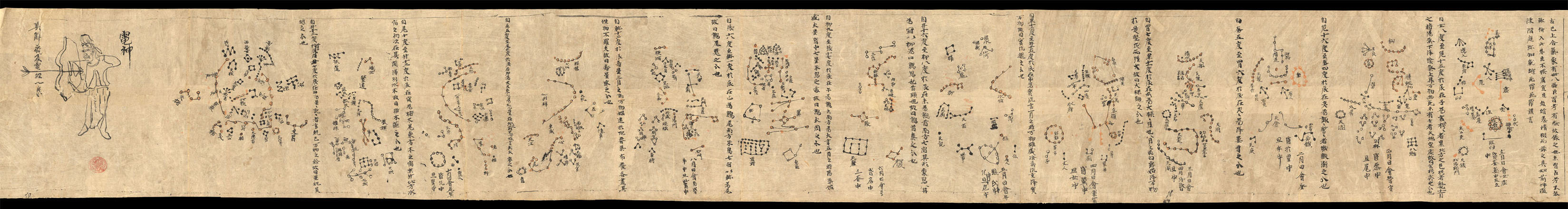
Chinese Dunhuang Star Atlas—one of the oldest extant star charts, believed to be from the 7th century, showing each of the lunar months and the north polar region with a total of 1345 stars in 257 constellations clearly marked and named

Color	Chinese Astronomer	Comments
Black	Gan De (甘德)	
Red	Shi Shen (石申)	
White	Wu Xian (巫咸)	There have been inconsistencies in his works. He is generally known as the astronomer who lived before Gan and Shi.
Yellow	Others	

== See also ==
- Chinese star maps
