= Shi Shen (crater) =

Crater on the Moon

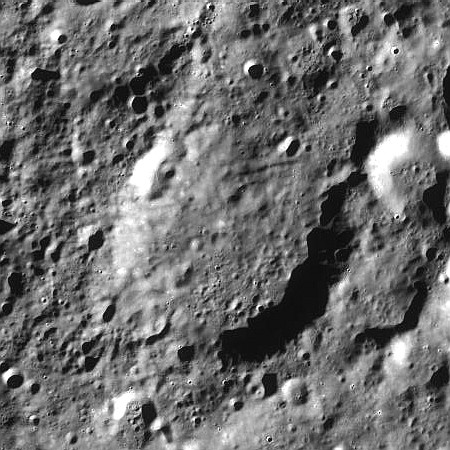
- Coordinates: 76.0°N 104.1°E
- Diameter: 43 km
- Depth: Unknown
- Colongitude: 260° at sunrise
- Eponym: Shi Shen

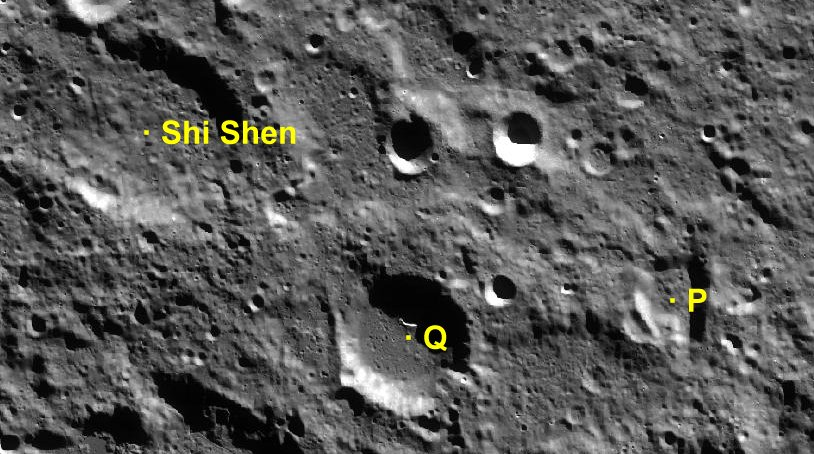
Satellite features

Shi Shen is a crater on the far side of the Moon. It lies to the northwest of the large walled plain named Schwarzschild, and the south-southeast of the crater Nansen along the north-northeastern limb. Shi Shen is located in the region of the lunar surface that is sometimes brought into view of the Earth due to libration, but even then it is viewed from the edge and not much detail can be seen.

This is an old, eroded crater with an outer rim that is rounded and somewhat irregular. The northern part of the rim has a wider inner wall, and there is a small crater along the north-northwestern edge. The interior floor is relatively level, but uneven, particularly in the northern half.

== Satellite craters ==
By convention these features are identified on lunar maps by placing the letter on the side of the crater midpoint that is closest to Shi Shen.

Shi Shen	Latitude	Longitude	Diameter
P	71.7° N	97.0° E	22 km
Q	74.2° N	96.3° E	45 km
