= Galilean moons =

Four largest moons of Jupiter

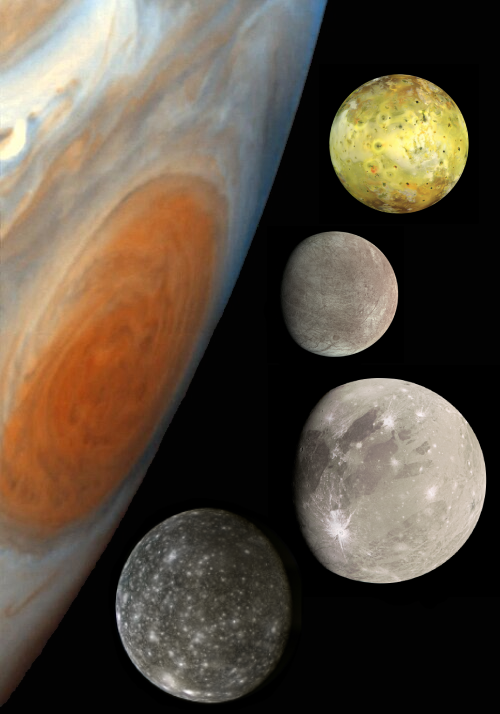
Montage of Jupiter's four Galilean moons in a composite image depicting part of Jupiter and their relative sizes (positions are illustrative, not actual). From top to bottom: Io, Europa, Ganymede, Callisto.

The Galilean moons (/ˌɡælɪˈleɪ.ən/), or Galilean satellites, are the four largest moons of Jupiter. They are, in descending-size order, Ganymede, Callisto, Io, and Europa. They are the most readily visible Solar System objects after Saturn, the dimmest of the classical planets; though their closeness to bright Jupiter makes naked-eye observation very difficult, they are readily seen with common binoculars, even under night sky conditions of high light pollution. The invention of the telescope allowed astronomers to discover the moons in 1610. Through this, they became the first Solar System objects discovered since humans have started tracking the classical planets, and the first objects to be found to orbit any planet beyond Earth.

They are planetary-mass moons and among the largest objects in the Solar System. All four, along with Titan, Triton, and Earth's Moon, are larger than any of the Solar System's dwarf planets. The largest, Ganymede, is the largest moon in the Solar System and surpasses the planet Mercury in size (though not mass). Callisto is only slightly smaller than Mercury in size; the smaller ones, Io and Europa, are about the size of the Moon. The three inner moons — Io, Europa, and Ganymede — are in a 4:2:1 orbital resonance with each other. While the Galilean moons are spherical, all of Jupiter's remaining moons have irregular forms because they are too small for their self-gravitation to pull them into spheres.

The Galilean moons are named after Galileo Galilei, who observed them in either December 1609 or January 1610, and recognized them as satellites of Jupiter in March 1610; they remained the only known moons of Jupiter until the discovery of the fifth largest moon of Jupiter Amalthea in 1892. Galileo initially named his discovery the Cosmica Sidera ("Cosimo's stars") or Medicean Stars, but the names that eventually prevailed were chosen by Simon Marius. Marius discovered the moons independently at nearly the same time as Galileo, 8 January 1610, and gave them their present individual names, after mythological characters that Zeus seduced or abducted, which were suggested by Johannes Kepler in his Mundus Jovialis, published in 1614. Their discovery showed the importance of the telescope as a tool for astronomers by proving that there were objects in space that cannot be seen by the naked eye. The discovery of celestial bodies orbiting something other than Earth dealt a serious blow to the then-accepted (among educated Europeans) Ptolemaic world system, a geocentric theory in which everything orbits around Earth.

== History ==
=== Pre-discovery ===
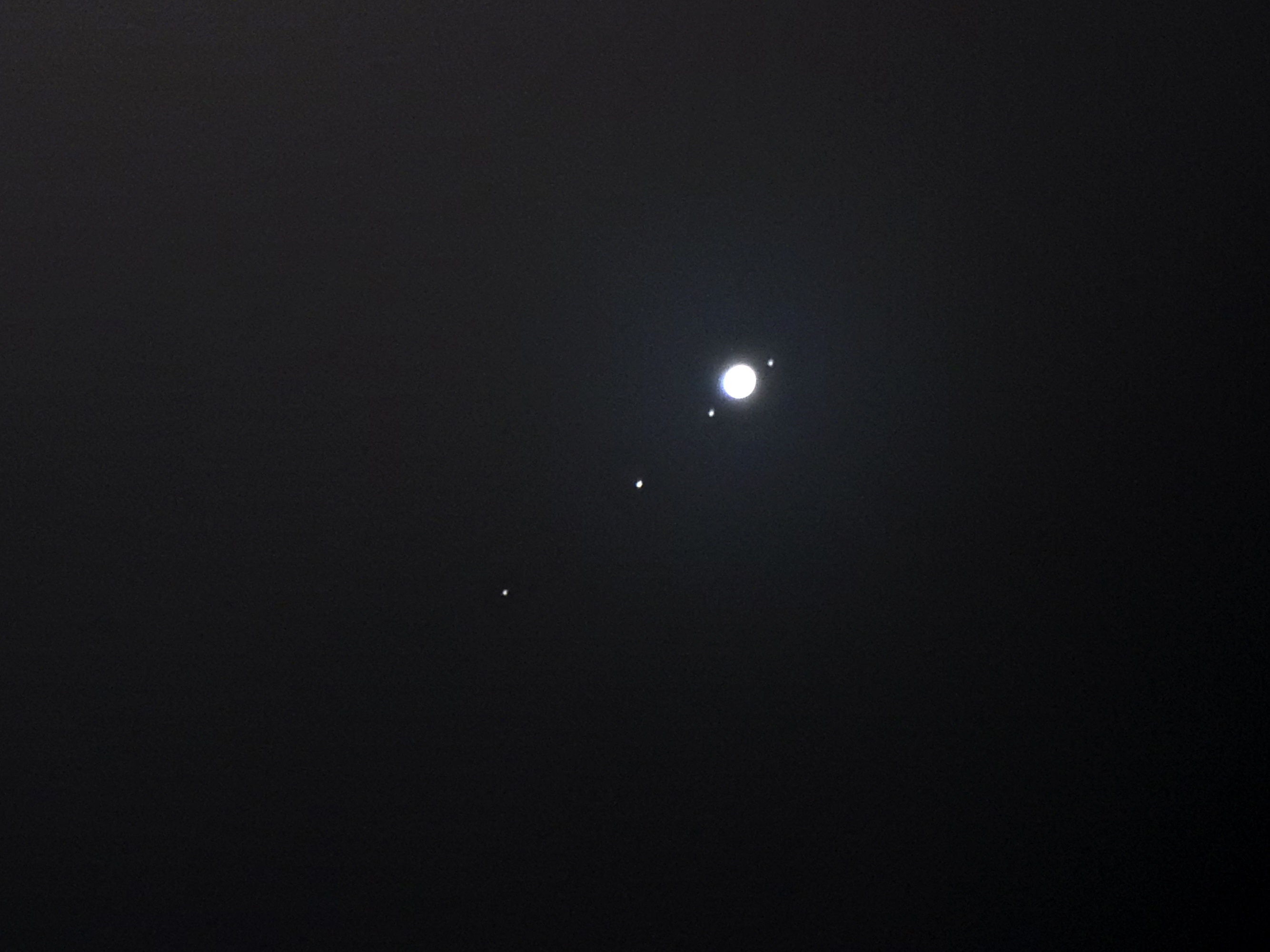
Photograph of Jupiter and its Galilean moons, showing how they appear with binoculars

Chinese astronomical records report that in 365 BC, Gan De observed a small reddish star beside Jupiter, which might have been a moon of Jupiter, possibly Ganymede, with the naked eye. However, Gan De reported the color of the companion as reddish, which is puzzling since Ganymede is too faint for its color to be perceived with the naked eye. Shi Shen and Gan De together made fairly accurate observations of the five major planets. If the companion is indeed Ganymede, this might predate Galileo's discovery by around two millennia.

=== Discovery ===
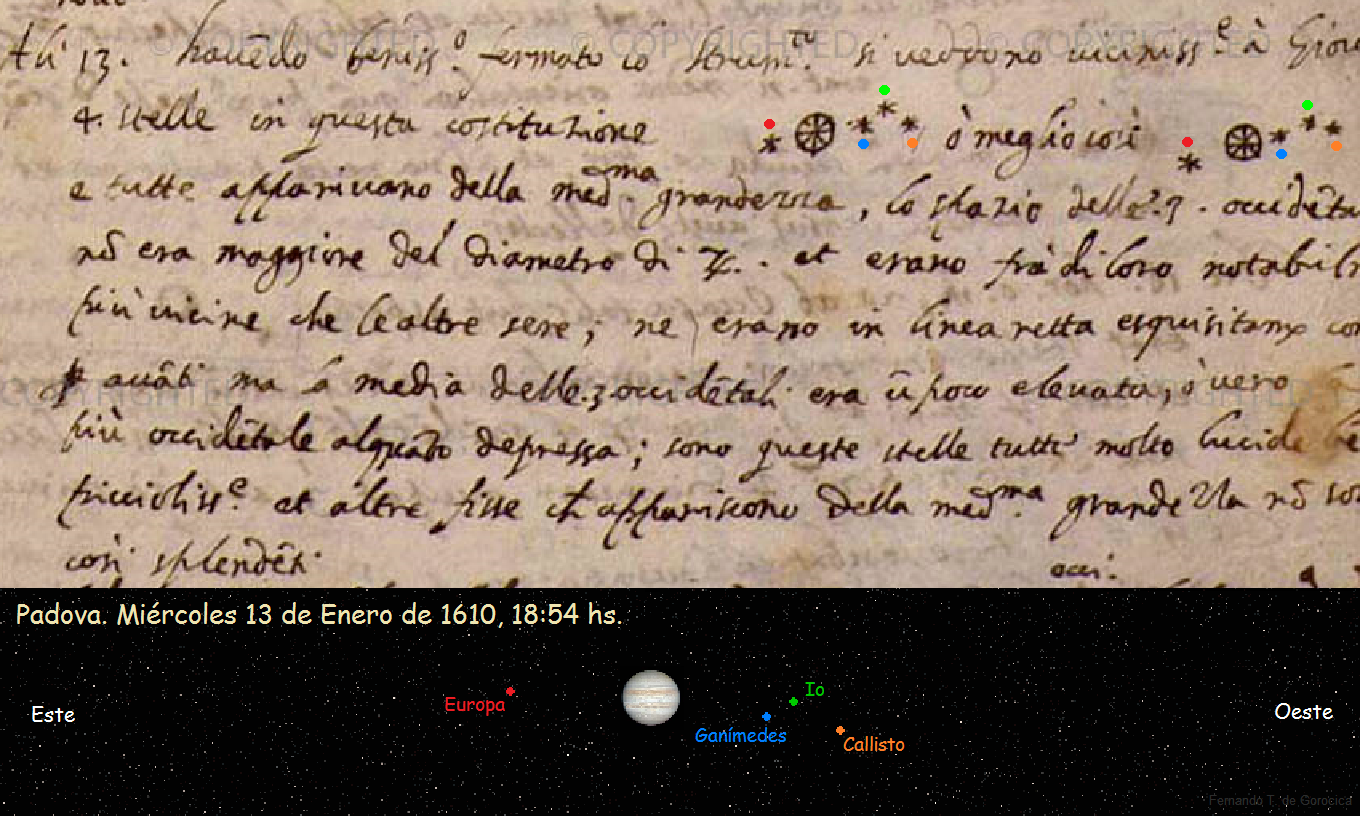
Galileo Galilei's observations of 13 January 1610 in a manuscript noting the positions of the Jovian moons, with modern depiction of their positions

As a result of improvements that Galileo Galilei made to the telescope, with a magnifying capability of 20×, he was able to see celestial bodies more distinctly than was previously possible. This allowed Galileo to observe in January 1610 what came to be known as the Galilean moons.

On 7 January 1610, Galileo wrote a letter containing the first mention of Jupiter's moons. At the time, he saw only three of them, and he believed them to be fixed stars near Jupiter. It turned out to be Ganymede, Callisto, and the combined light from Io and Europa. The next night he noticed that they had moved. On January 13, he saw all four at once for the first time, but had seen each of the moons before this date at least once. By January 15, Galileo concluded that the stars were actually bodies orbiting Jupiter. He continued to observe these celestial orbs to 2 March 1610.

Galileo's discovery proved the importance of the telescope as a tool for astronomers by showing that there were objects in space to be discovered that until then had remained unseen by the naked eye. More importantly, the discovery of celestial bodies orbiting something other than Earth dealt a blow to the then-accepted Ptolemaic world system, which held that Earth was at the center of the universe and all other celestial bodies revolved around it. Galileo's 13 March 1610, Sidereus Nuncius (Starry Messenger), which announced celestial observations through his telescope, does not explicitly mention Copernican heliocentrism, a theory that placed the Sun at the center of the universe. Nevertheless, Galileo accepted the Copernican theory.

Simon Marius claimed another observation, and he later reported observing the moons in November 1609, with a first written record for 29 December 1609. However, because he did not publish these findings until after Galileo, there is a degree of uncertainty around his records. Later, it turned out that he had used the old style Julian calendar, while Galilei used the modern style Gregorian one. So, in fact, Marius observed the moons first on 8 January 1610, one day after Galilei.

=== Names ===
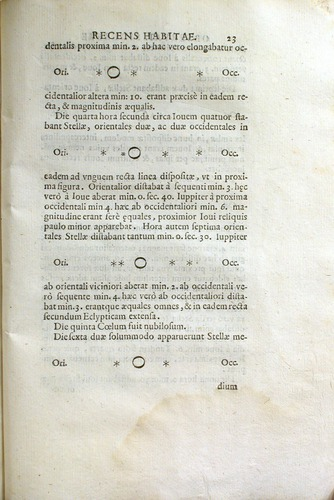
The Medician stars in the Sidereus Nuncius (the 'starry messenger'), 1610. The moons are drawn in changing positions.

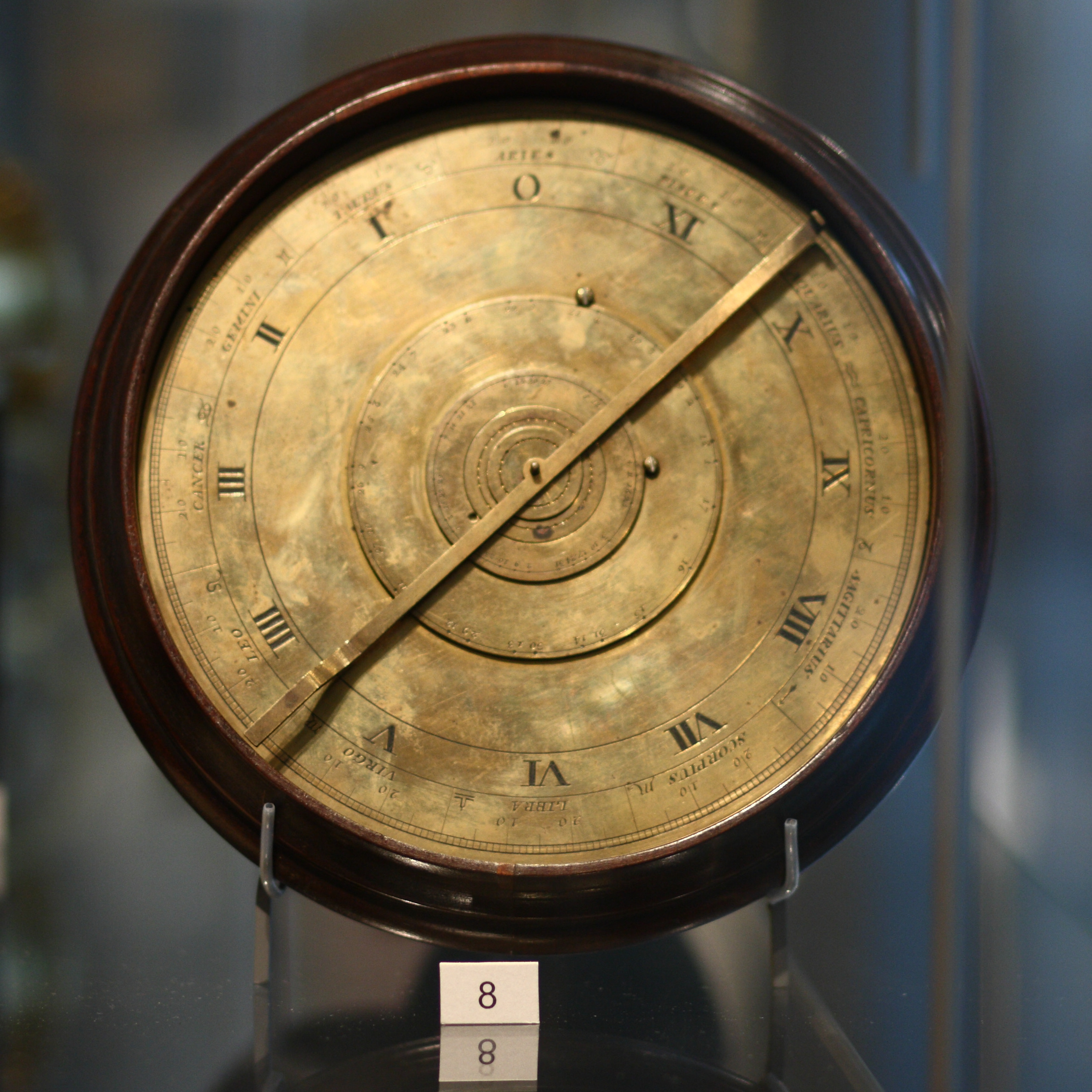
A Jovilabe: an apparatus from the mid-18th century for demonstrating the orbits of Jupiter's satellites

In 1605, Galileo had been employed as a mathematics tutor for Cosimo de' Medici. In 1609, Cosimo became Grand Duke Cosimo II of Tuscany. Galileo, seeking patronage from his now-wealthy former student and his powerful family, used the discovery of Jupiter's moons to gain it. On 13 February 1610, Galileo wrote to the Grand Duke's secretary:

God graced me with being able, through such a singular sign, to reveal to my Lord my devotion and the desire I have that his glorious name live as equal among the stars, and since it is up to me, the first discoverer, to name these new planets, I wish, in imitation of the great sages who placed the most excellent heroes of that age among the stars, to inscribe these with the name of the Most Serene Grand Duke.

Galileo initially called his discovery the Cosmica Sidera ("Cosimo's stars"), in honour of Cosimo alone. (Note: Cosimo is the Italian form of the Greek name Cosmas itself deriving from cosmos (whence the neuter plural adjective cosmica). Sidera is the plural form of the Latin noun sidus "star, constellation".) Cosimo's secretary suggested to change the name to Medicea Sidera ("the Medician stars"), honouring all four Medici brothers (Cosimo, Francesco, Carlo, and Lorenzo). The discovery was announced in the Sidereus Nuncius ("Starry Messenger"), published in Venice in March 1610, less than two months after the first observations.

On 12 March 1610, Galileo wrote his dedicatory letter to the Duke of Tuscany, and the next day sent a copy to the Grand Duke, hoping to obtain the Grand Duke's support as quickly as possible. On 19 March, he sent the telescope he had used to first view Jupiter's moons to the Grand Duke, along with an official copy of Sidereus Nuncius (The Starry Messenger) that, following the secretary's advice, named the four moons the Medician Stars. In his dedicatory introduction, Galileo wrote:

Scarcely have the immortal graces of your soul begun to shine forth on earth than bright stars offer themselves in the heavens which, like tongues, will speak of and celebrate your most excellent virtues for all time. Behold, therefore, four stars reserved for your illustrious name ... which ... make their journeys and orbits with a marvelous speed around the star of Jupiter ... like children of the same family ... Indeed, it appears the Maker of the Stars himself, by clear arguments, admonished me to call these new planets by the illustrious name of Your Highness before all others.

Other names put forward include:

- I. Principharus (for the "prince" of Tuscany), II. Victripharus (after Vittoria della Rovere), III. Cosmipharus (after Cosimo de' Medici) and IV. Fernipharus (after Duke Ferdinando de' Medici) – by Giovanni Battista Hodierna, a disciple of Galileo and author of the first ephemerides (Medicaeorum Ephemerides, 1656);
- Circulatores Jovis, or Jovis Comites – by Johannes Hevelius;
- Gardes, or Satellites (from the Latin satelles, satellitis, meaning "escorts") – by Jacques Ozanam.

The names that eventually prevailed were chosen by Simon Marius, who had discovered the moons independently at about the same time as Galileo. At the suggestion of Johannes Kepler, he named them after four lovers of the god Zeus (the Greek equivalent of Jupiter) in his Mundus Jovialis (published in 1614):

Jupiter is much blamed by the poets on account of his irregular loves. Three maidens are especially mentioned as having been clandestinely courted by Jupiter with success. Io, daughter of the River Inachus, Callisto of Lycaon, Europa of Agenor. Then there was Ganymede, the handsome son of King Tros, whom Jupiter, having taken the form of an eagle, transported to heaven on his back, as poets fabulously tell ... I think, therefore, that I shall not have done amiss if the First is called by me Io, the Second Europa, the Third, on account of its majesty of light, Ganymede, the Fourth Callisto ... This fancy, and the particular names given, were suggested to me by Kepler, Imperial Astronomer, when we met at Ratisbon fair in October 1613. So if, as a jest, and in memory of our friendship then begun, I hail him as joint father of these four stars, again I shall not be doing wrong.

Galileo steadfastly refused to use Marius's names and invented as a result the numbering scheme that is still used nowadays, in parallel with proper moon names. The numbers run from Jupiter outward, thus I, II, III and IV for Io, Europa, Ganymede, and Callisto respectively. Galileo used this system in his notebooks but never actually published it. The numbered names (Jupiter x) were used until the mid-20th century when other inner moons were discovered, and Marius's names became widely used.

The Galilean moons' namesakes

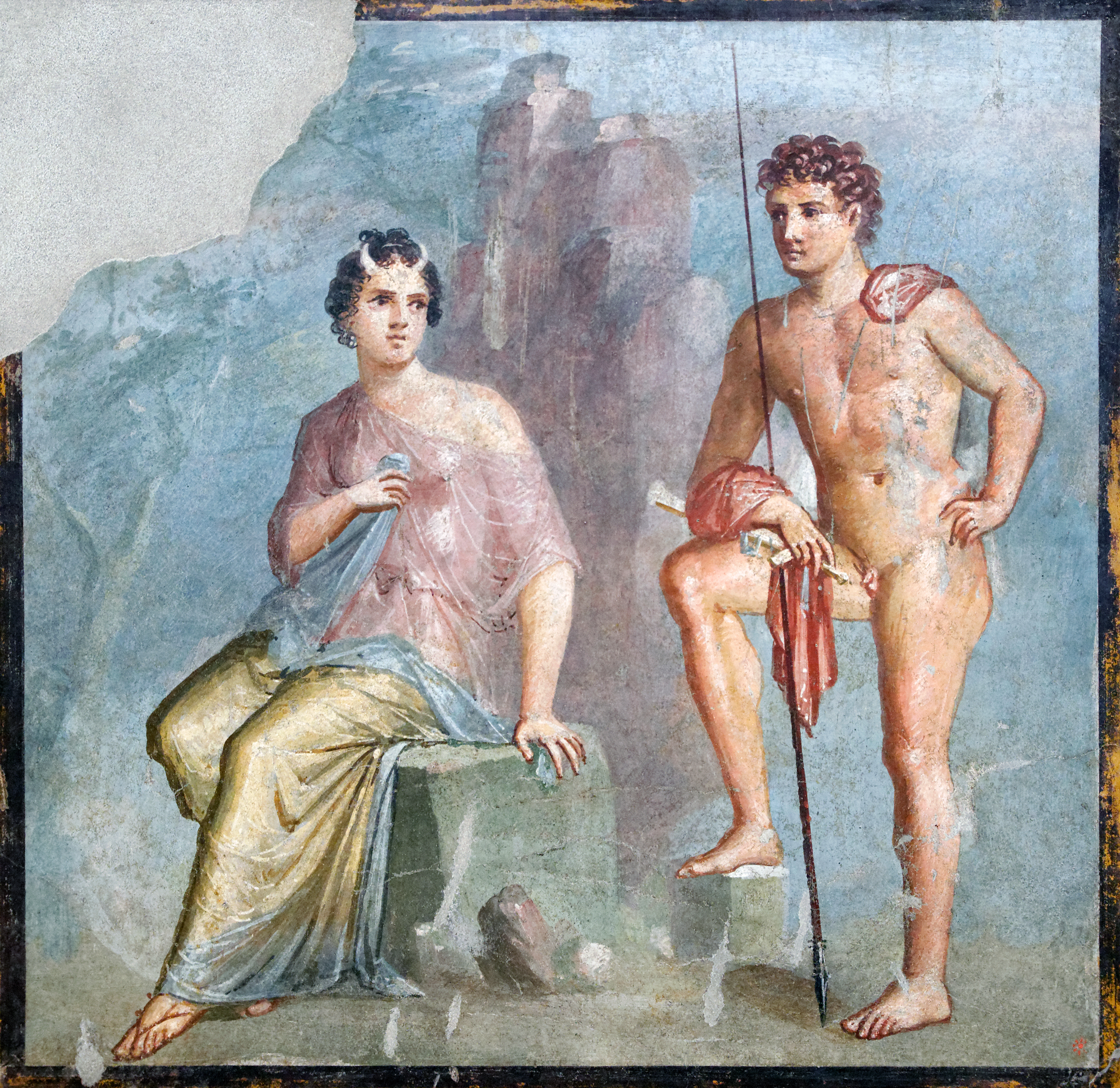
Io (left) watched by Argus Panoptes (right) on Hera's orders

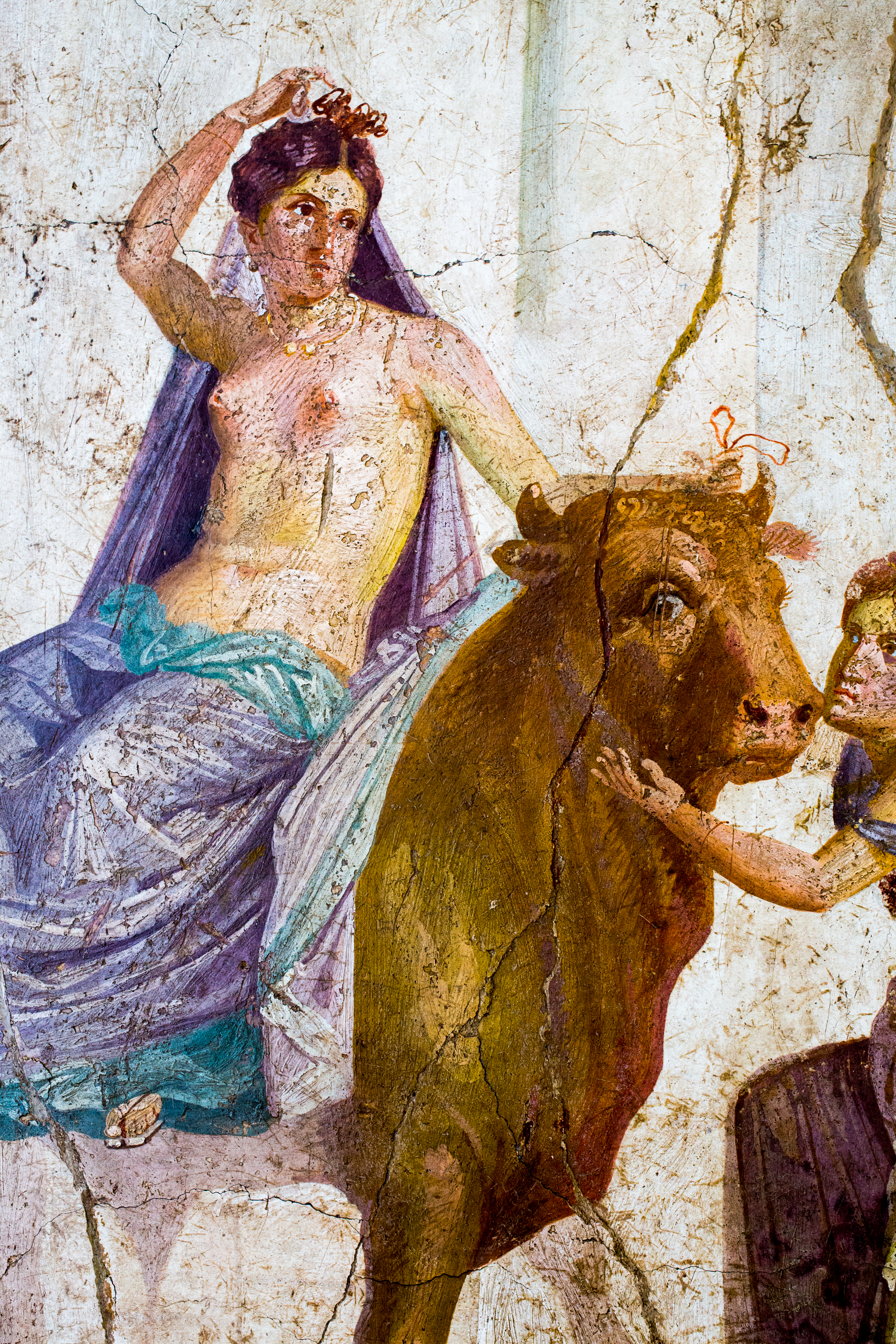
Europa on the back of Zeus turned into a bull

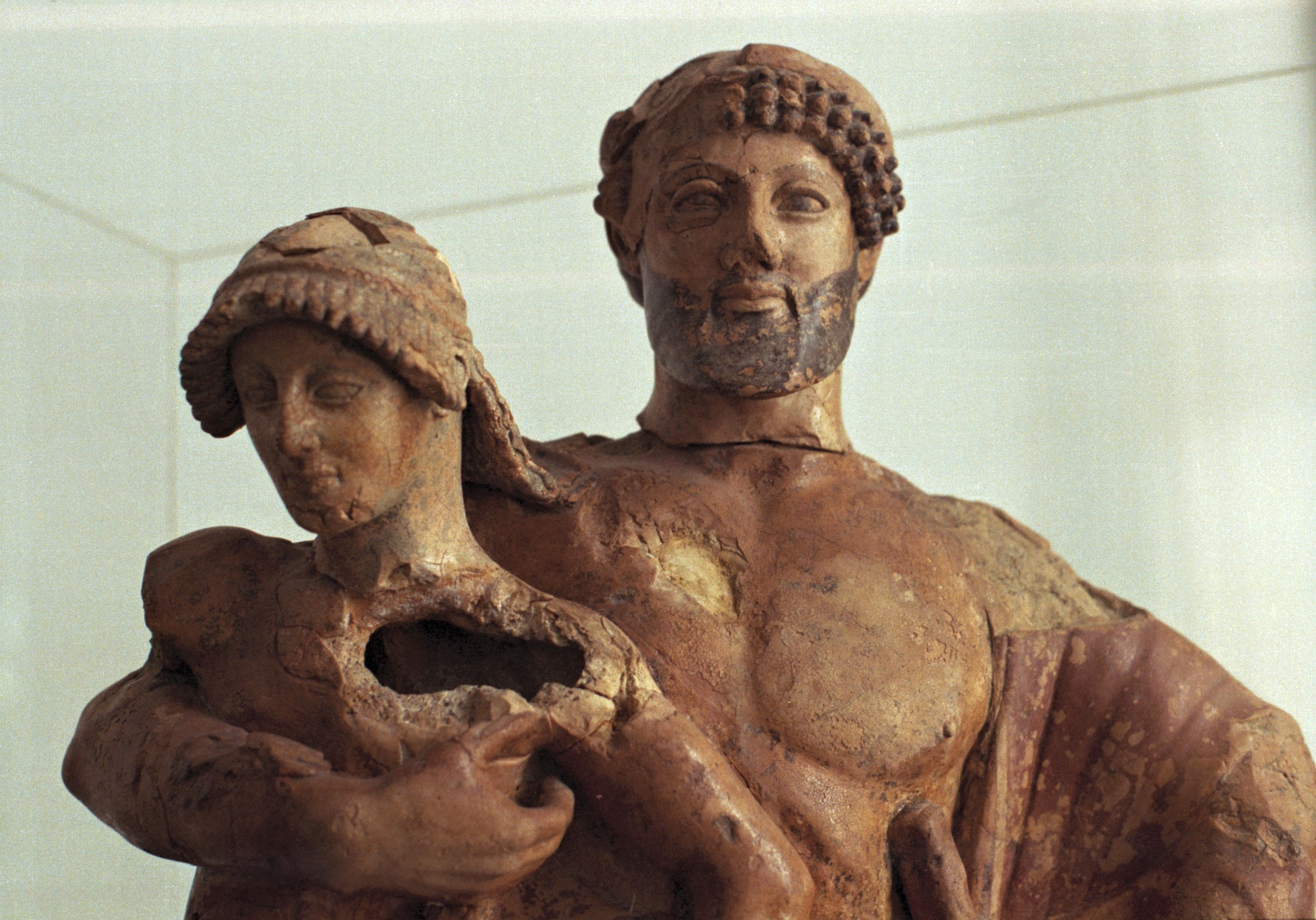
Ganymede (left) abducted by Zeus (right)

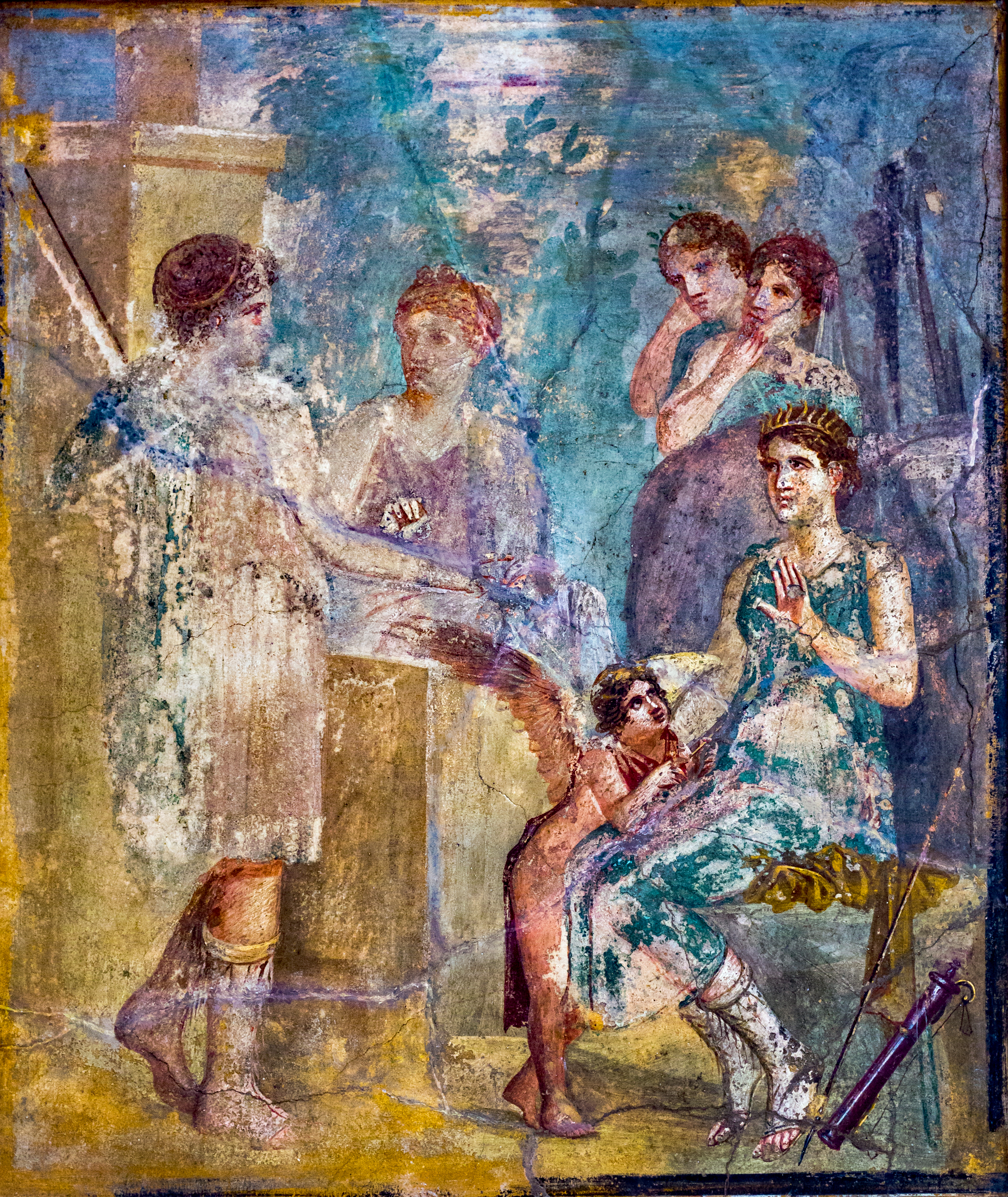
Callisto (leftmost) with Eros and other nymphs, with Artemis seated

=== Determination of longitude ===
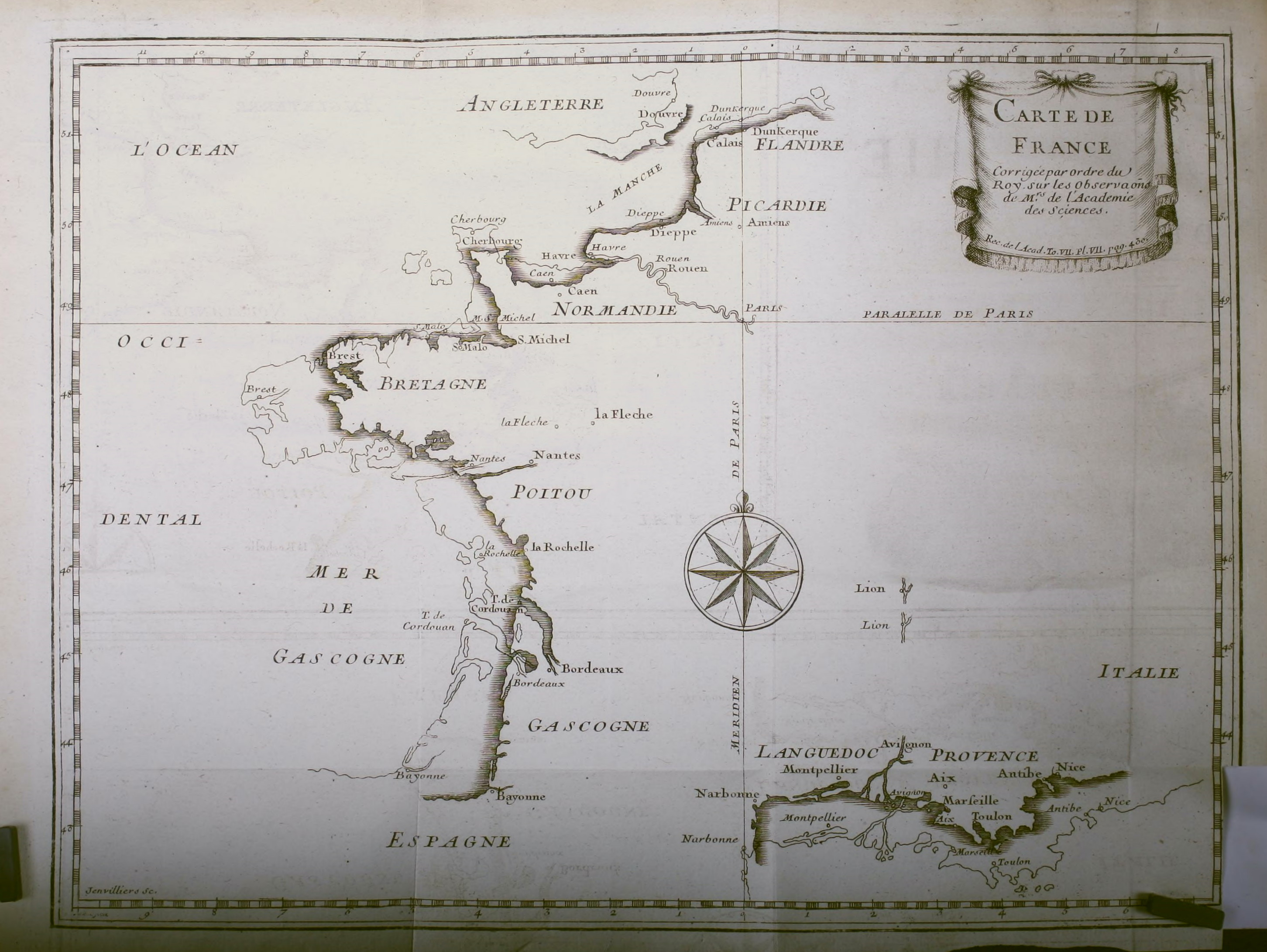
Map of France presented in 1684, showing the outline of a previous map (Sanson, light outline) compared to the new survey by Cassini and Picard using the moons of Jupiter as timing reference (heavier, shaded outline). The King of France reportedly quipped that the astronomers had taken more territory from him than his enemies.

Galileo's discovery had practical applications. Safe navigation required accurately determining a ship's position at sea. While latitude could be measured well enough by local astronomical observations, determining longitude required knowledge of the time of each observation synchronized to the time at a reference longitude. The longitude problem was so important that large prizes were offered for its solution at various times by Spain, The Netherlands, and The United Kingdom.

Galileo proposed determining longitude based on the timing of the orbits of the Galilean moons. The times of the eclipses of the moons could be precisely calculated in advance and compared with local observations on land or on ship to determine the local time and hence longitude. Galileo applied in 1616 for the Spanish prize of 6,000 gold ducats with a lifetime pension of 2,000 a year, and almost two decades later for the Dutch prize, but by then he was under house arrest for possible heresy.

The main problem with the Jovian moon technique was that it was difficult to observe the Galilean moons through a telescope on a moving ship, a problem that Galileo tried to solve with the invention of the celatone. Others suggested improvements, but without success.

Land mapping surveys had the same problem determining longitude, though with less severe observational conditions. The method proved practical and was used by Giovanni Domenico Cassini and Jean Picard to re-map France.

== Comparative structure ==
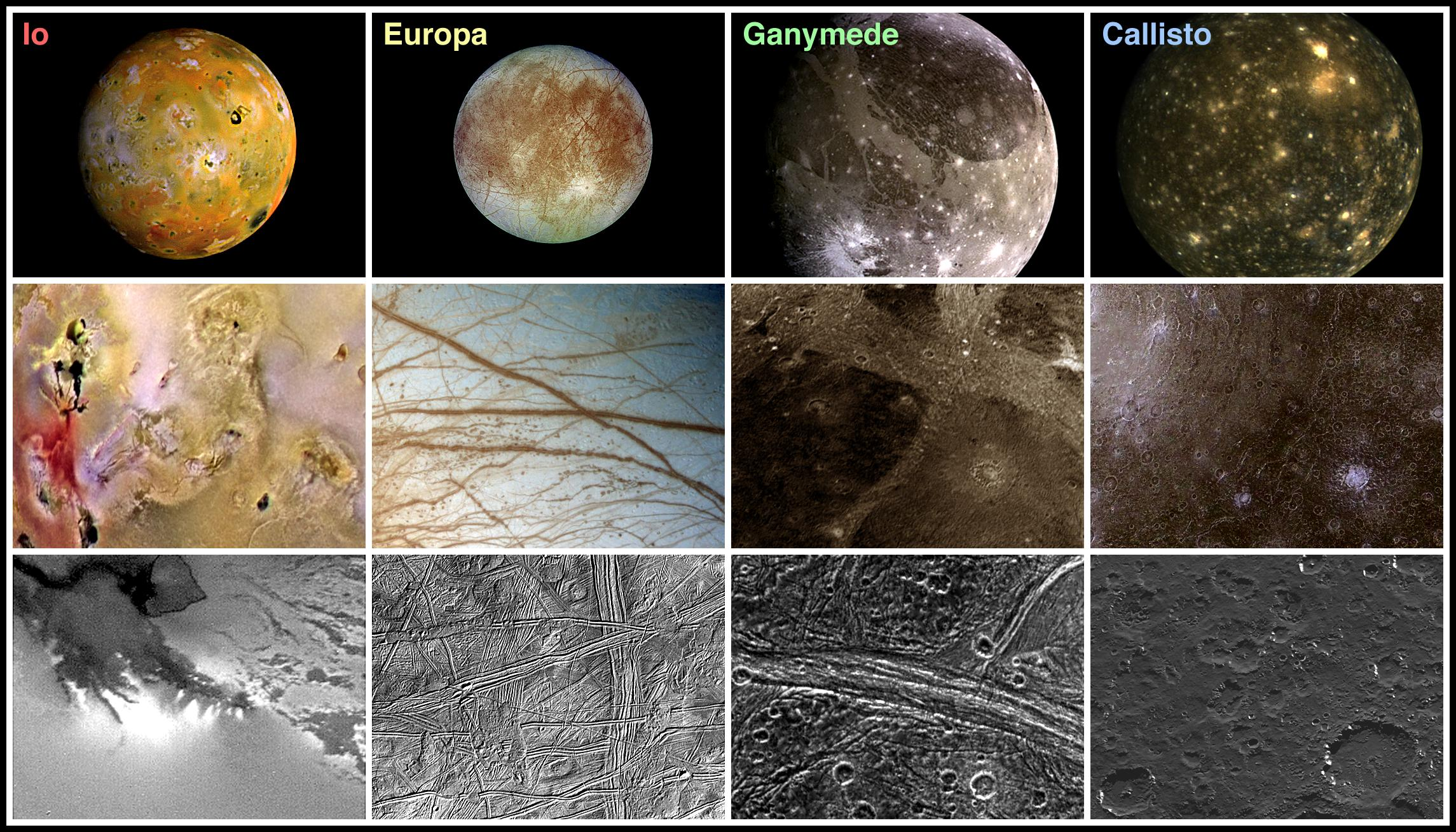
Surface features of the four members at different levels of zoom in each row

Jovian radiation
Moon	rem/day
Io	3600
Europa	540
Ganymede	8
Callisto	0.01
Earth (Max)	0.07
Earth (Avg)	0.0007

Fluctuations in the orbits of the moons indicate that their mean density decreases with distance from Jupiter. Callisto, the outermost and least dense of the four, has a density intermediate between ice and rock whereas Io, the innermost and densest moon, has a density intermediate between rock and iron. Callisto has an ancient, heavily cratered and unaltered ice surface and the way it rotates indicates that its density is equally distributed, suggesting that it has no rocky or metallic core but consists of a homogeneous mix of rock and ice. This may well have been the original structure of all the moons. The rotation of the three inner moons, in contrast, indicates differentiation of their interiors with denser matter at the core and lighter matter above. They also reveal significant alteration of the surface. Ganymede reveals past tectonic movement of the ice surface which required partial melting of subsurface layers. Europa reveals more dynamic and recent movement of this nature, suggesting a thinner ice crust. Finally, Io, the innermost moon, has a sulfur surface, active volcanism and no sign of ice. All this evidence suggests that the nearer a moon is to Jupiter the hotter its interior. The current model is that the moons experience tidal heating as a result of the gravitational field of Jupiter in inverse proportion to the square of their distance from the giant planet. In all but Callisto this will have melted the interior ice, allowing rock and iron to sink to the interior and water to cover the surface. In Ganymede a thick and solid ice crust then formed. In warmer Europa a thinner more easily broken crust formed. In Io the heating is so extreme that all the rock has melted and water has long ago boiled out into space.

Galilean moons compared with moons of other planets (and with Earth; the scale is changed to 1 pixel = 94 km at this resolution).

== Members ==
Name	Image	Model of interior	Diameter (km)	Mass (kg)	Density (g/cm^{3})	Semi-major axis (km) (Note: Computed using the IAU-MPC Satellites Ephemeris Service μ value)	Orbital period (days) (relative to Io)	Inclination (°) (Note: Computed from IAG Travaux 2001 Archived 2011-08-07 at the Wayback Machine.)	Eccentricity
Io; Jupiter I			3660.0 × 3637.4 × 3630.6	8.93×10^{22}	3.528	421800	1.769 (1)	0.050	0.0041
Europa; Jupiter II			3121.6	4.8×10^{22}	3.014	671100	3.551 (2.0)	0.471	0.0094
Ganymede; Jupiter III			5268.2	1.48×10^{23}	1.936	1070400	7.155 (4.0)	0.204	0.0011
Callisto; Jupiter IV			4820.6	1.08×10^{23}	1.834	1882700	16.689 (9.4)	0.205	0.0074

=== Io ===
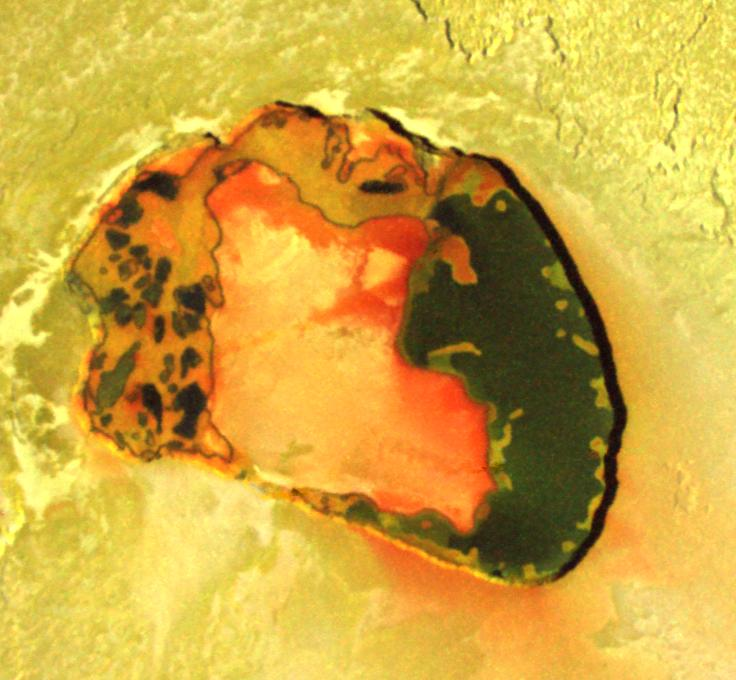
Tupan Patera on Io

Io (Jupiter I) is the innermost of the four Galilean moons of Jupiter; with a diameter of 3642 kilometers, it is the fourth-largest moon in the Solar System, and is only marginally larger than Earth's moon. It was named after Io, a priestess of Hera who became one of the lovers of Zeus. It was referred to as "Jupiter I", or "The first satellite of Jupiter" until the mid-20th century.

With over 400 active volcanos, Io is the most geologically active object in the Solar System. Its surface is dotted with more than 100 mountains, some of which are taller than Earth's Mount Everest. Unlike most satellites in the outer Solar System (which have a thick coating of ice), Io is primarily composed of silicate rock surrounding a molten iron or iron sulfide core.

Although not proven, data from the Galileo orbiter indicates that Io might have its own magnetic field. Io has an extremely thin atmosphere made up mostly of sulfur dioxide (SO_{2}). If a surface data or collection vessel were to land on Io in the future, it would have to be extremely tough (similar to the tank-like bodies of the Soviet Venera landers) to survive the radiation and magnetic fields that originate from Jupiter.

=== Europa ===
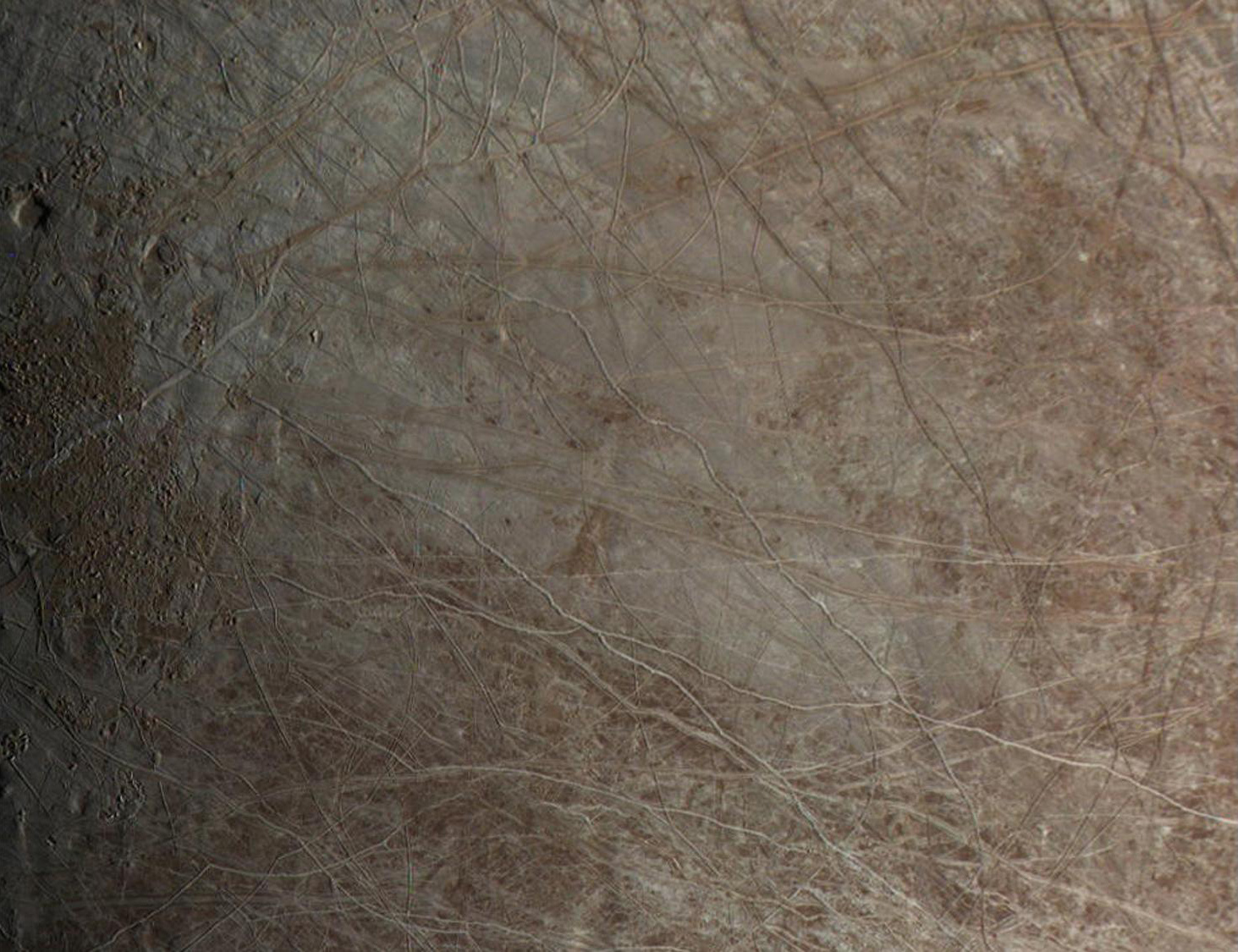
Closeup of Europan lineae

Europa (Jupiter II), the second of the four Galilean moons, is the second closest to Jupiter and the smallest at 3121.6 kilometers in diameter, which is slightly smaller than Earth's Moon. The name comes from a mythical Phoenician noblewoman, Europa, who was courted by Zeus and became the queen of Crete, though the name did not become widely used until the mid-20th century.

It has a smooth and bright surface, with a layer of water surrounding the mantle of the planet, thought to be 100 kilometers thick. The smooth surface includes a layer of ice, while the bottom of the ice is theorized to be liquid water. The apparent youth and smoothness of the surface have led to the hypothesis that a water ocean exists beneath it, which could conceivably serve as an abode for extraterrestrial life. Heat energy from tidal flexing ensures that the ocean remains liquid and drives geological activity. Life may exist in Europa's under-ice ocean. So far, there is no evidence that life exists on Europa, but the likely presence of liquid water has spurred calls to send a probe there.

The prominent markings that criss-cross the moon seem to be mainly albedo features, which emphasize low topography. There are few craters on Europa because its surface is tectonically active and young. Some theories suggest that Jupiter's gravity is causing these markings, as one side of Europa is constantly facing Jupiter. Volcanic water eruptions splitting the surface of Europa and even geysers have also been considered as causes but a recent paper put into doubt the existence of any plume on the moon. The reddish-brown color of the markings is theorized to be caused by sulfur, but because no data collection devices have been sent to Europa, scientists cannot yet confirm this. Europa is primarily made of silicate rock and likely has an iron core. It has a tenuous atmosphere composed primarily of oxygen.

=== Ganymede ===
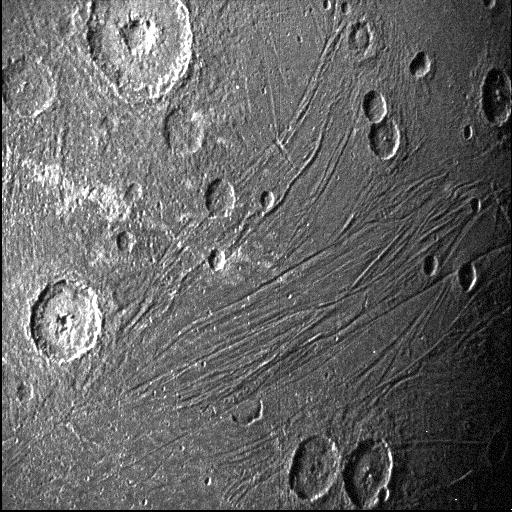
Ancient tectonic features on Xibalba Sulcus on Ganymede

Ganymede (Jupiter III), the third Galilean moon, is named after the mythological Ganymede, cupbearer of the Greek gods and Zeus's beloved. Ganymede is the largest natural satellite in the Solar System at 5262.4 kilometers in diameter, which makes it larger than the planet Mercury – although only at about half of its mass since Ganymede is an icy world. It is the only satellite in the Solar System known to possess a magnetosphere, likely created through convection within the liquid iron core.

Ganymede is composed primarily of silicate rock and water ice, and a salt-water ocean is believed to exist nearly 200 km below Ganymede's surface, sandwiched between layers of ice. The metallic core of Ganymede suggests a greater heat at some time in its past than had previously been proposed. The surface is a mix of two types of terrain—highly cratered dark regions and younger, but still ancient, regions with a large array of grooves and ridges. Ganymede has a high number of craters, but many are gone or barely visible due to its icy crust forming over them. The satellite has a thin oxygen atmosphere that includes O, O_{2}, and possibly O_{3} (ozone), and some atomic hydrogen.

=== Callisto ===
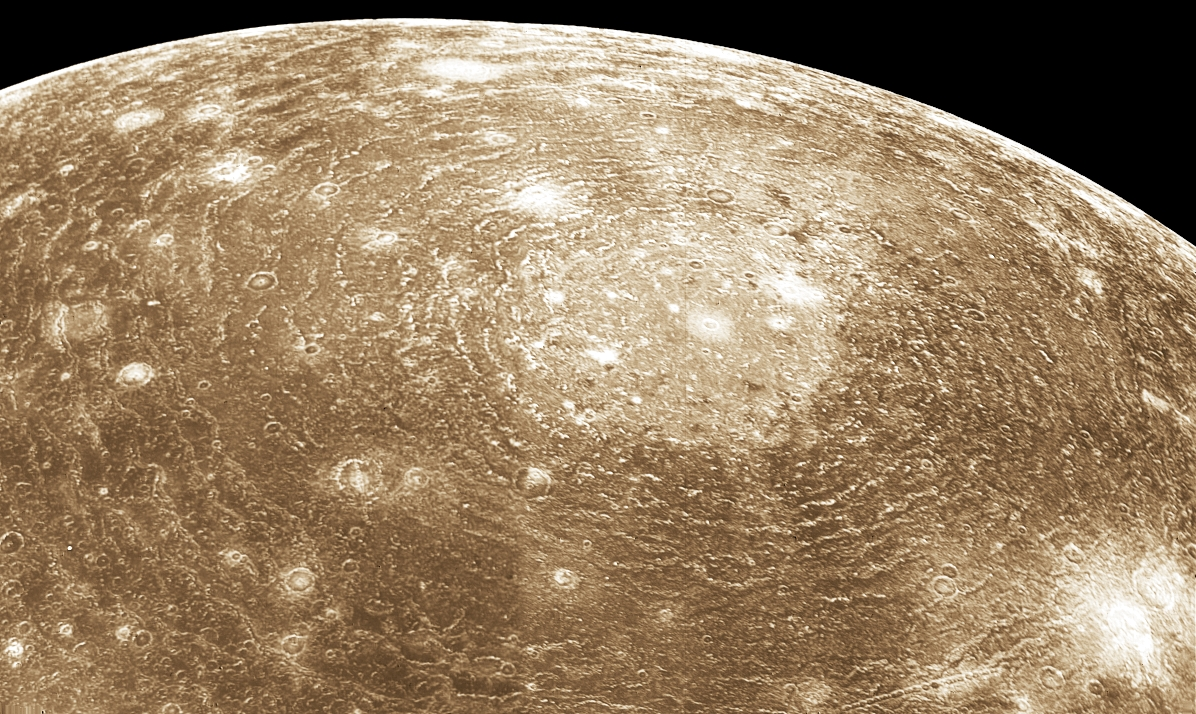
Callisto's Valhalla impact crater in enhanced color as seen by Voyager

Callisto (Jupiter IV) is the fourth and last Galilean moon, and is the second-largest of the four, and at 4820.6 kilometers in diameter, it is the third largest moon in the Solar System, and barely smaller than Mercury, though only a third of the latter's mass. It is named after the Greek mythological nymph Callisto, a lover of Zeus who was a daughter of the Arkadian King Lykaon and a hunting companion of the goddess Artemis. The moon does not form part of the orbital resonance that affects three inner Galilean satellites and thus does not experience appreciable tidal heating. Callisto is composed of approximately equal amounts of rock and ices, which makes it the least dense of the Galilean moons. It is one of the most heavily cratered satellites in the Solar System, and one major feature is a basin around 3000 km wide called Valhalla.

Callisto is surrounded by an extremely thin atmosphere composed of carbon dioxide and probably molecular oxygen. Investigation revealed that Callisto may possibly have a subsurface ocean of liquid water at depths less than 300 kilometres. The likely presence of an ocean within Callisto indicates that it can or could harbour life. However, this is less likely than on nearby Europa. Callisto has long been considered the most suitable place for a human base for future exploration of the Jupiter system since it is furthest from the intense radiation of Jupiter's magnetic field.

== Origin and evolution ==
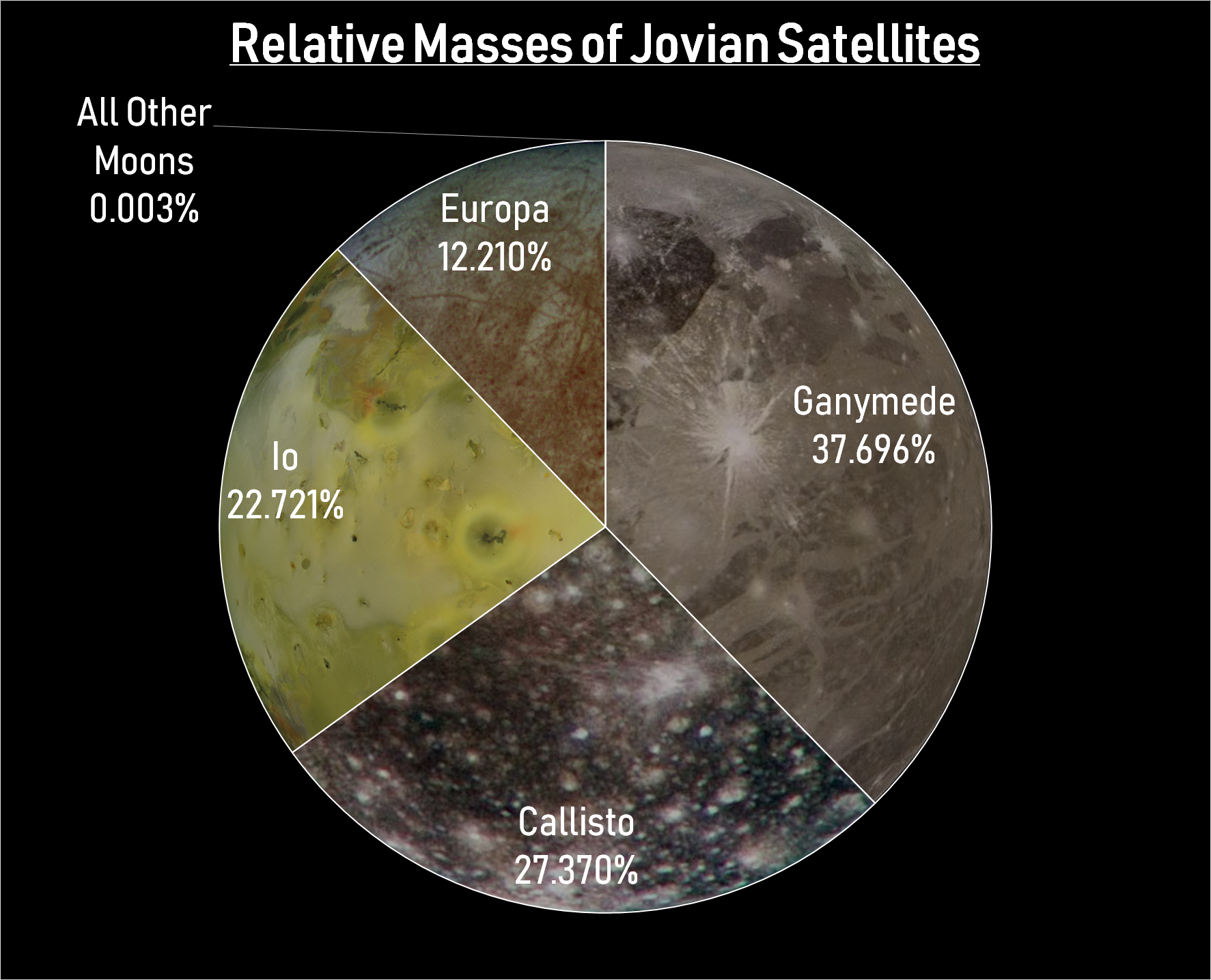
The relative masses of the Jovian moons. Those smaller than Europa are not visible at this scale, and combined would only be visible at 100× magnification.

Jupiter's regular satellites are believed to have formed from a circumplanetary disk, a ring of accreting gas and solid debris analogous to a protoplanetary disk. They may be the remnants of a score of Galilean-mass satellites that formed early in Jupiter's history.

Simulations suggest that, while the disk had a relatively high mass at any given moment, over time a substantial fraction (several tenths of a percent) of the mass of Jupiter captured from the Solar nebula was processed through it. However, the disk mass of only 2% that of Jupiter is required to explain the existing satellites. Thus there may have been several generations of Galilean-mass satellites in Jupiter's early history. Each generation of moons would have spiraled into Jupiter, due to drag from the disk, with new moons then forming from the new debris captured from the Solar nebula. By the time the present (possibly fifth) generation formed, the disk had thinned out to the point that it no longer greatly interfered with the moons' orbits. The current Galilean moons were still affected, falling into and being partially protected by an orbital resonance which still exists for Io, Europa, and Ganymede. Ganymede's larger mass means that it would have migrated inward at a faster rate than Europa or Io. Tidal dissipation in the Jovian system is still ongoing and Callisto will likely be captured into the resonance in about 1.5 billion years, creating a 1:2:4:8 chain.

== Visibility ==
All four Galilean moons are bright enough to be viewed from Earth without a telescope, if only they could appear farther away from Jupiter. (They are, however, easily distinguished with even low-powered binoculars.) They have apparent magnitudes between 4.6 and 5.6 when Jupiter is in opposition with the Sun, and are about one unit of magnitude dimmer when Jupiter is in conjunction. The main difficulty in observing the moons from Earth is their proximity to Jupiter, since they are obscured by its brightness. (Note: Jupiter is about 750 times brighter than Ganymede and about 2000 times brighter than Callisto. Ganymede: (5th root of 100)^(4.4 Ganymede APmag − (−2.8 Jup APmag)) = 758 Callisto: (5th root of 100)^(5.5 Callisto APmag − (−2.8 Jup APmag)) = 2089) The maximum angular separations of the moons are between 2 and 10 arcminutes from Jupiter, (Note: Jupiter near perihelion 2010-Sep-19: 656.7 (Callisto angular separation arcsec) − 24.9 (jup angular radius arcsec) = 631 arcsec = 10 arcmin) which is close to the limit of human visual acuity. Ganymede and Callisto, at their maximum separation, are the likeliest targets for potential naked-eye observation.

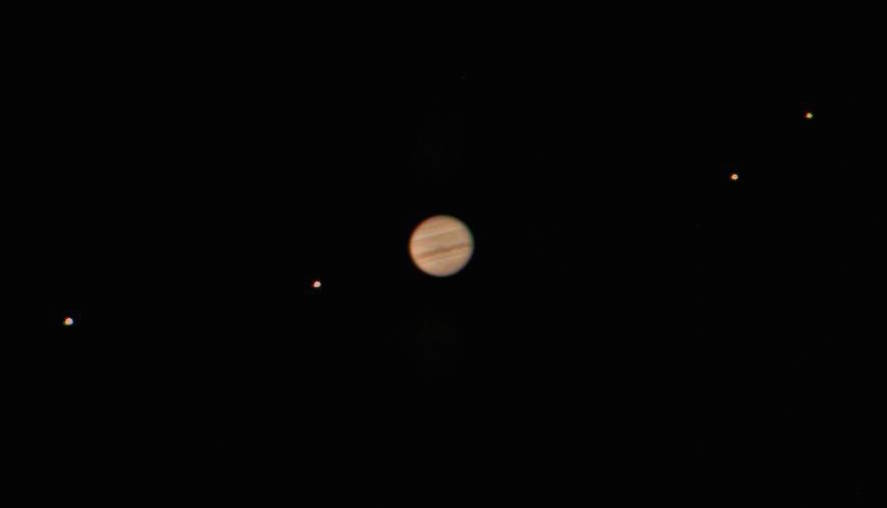
Jupiter and all of the Galilean moons as seen through a 25 cm (10 in) amateur telescope (Meade LX200).

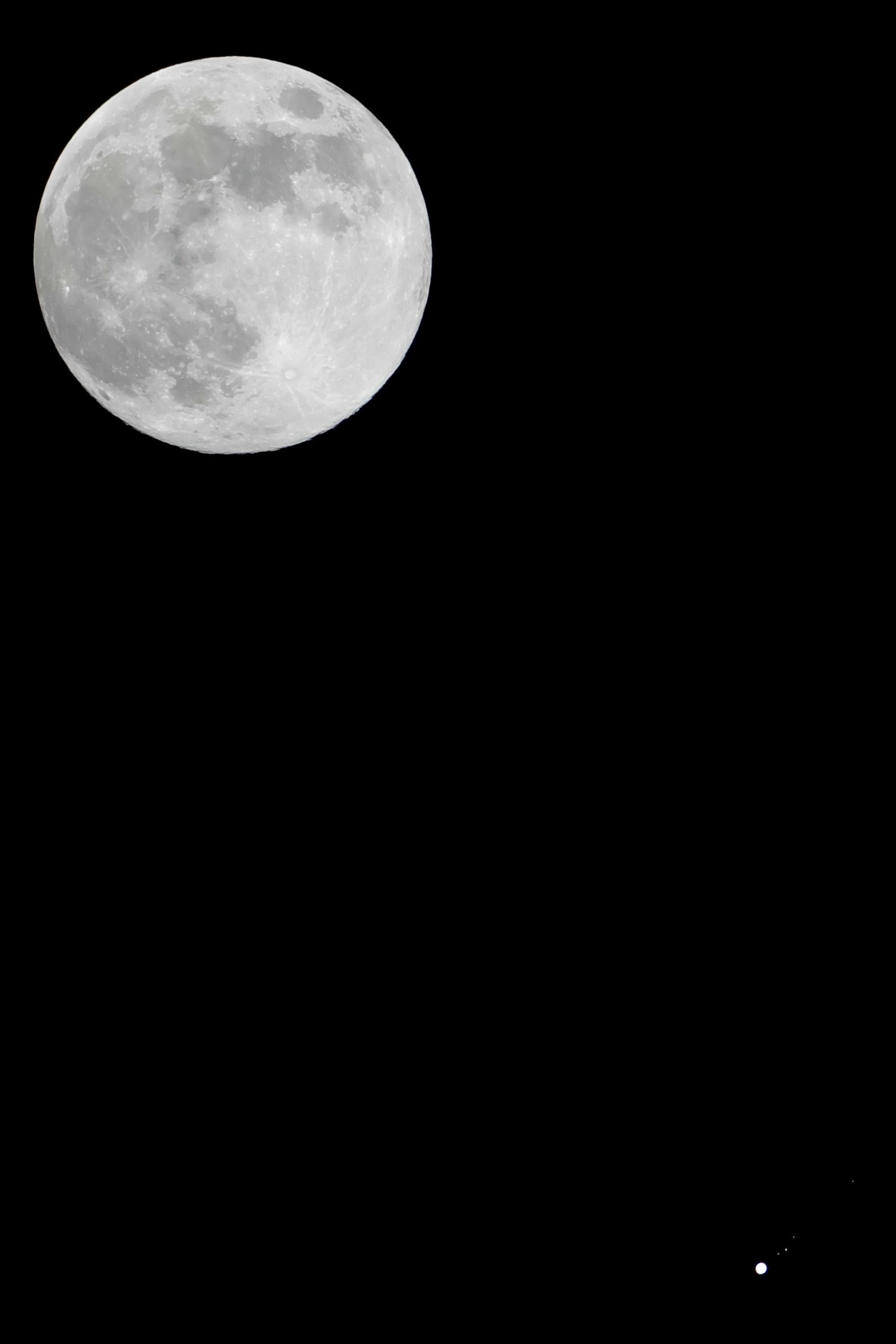
Jupiter with the Galilean moons and the full Moon as seen around conjunction on 10 April 2017

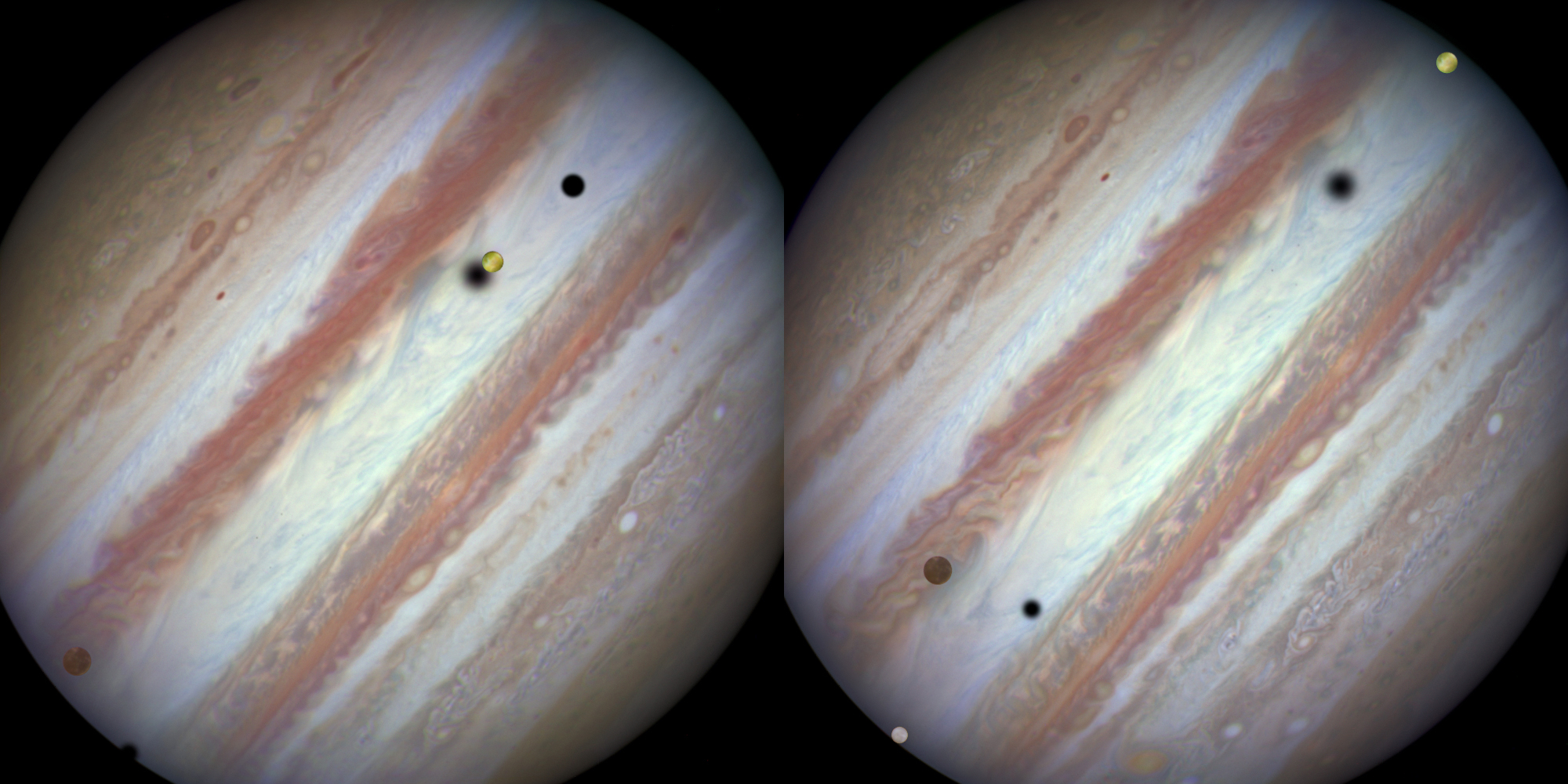
Two Hubble Space Telescope views of a rare triple transit of Jupiter by Europa, Callisto and Io (24 January 2015)

== Gallery ==
=== Orbit animations ===
GIF animations depicting the Galilean moon orbits and the resonance of Io, Europa, and Ganymede

The Laplace resonance of Io, Europa and Ganymede (conjunctions are highlighted by color changes)

The Galilean moons orbiting Jupiter
Jupiter · Io · Europa · Ganymede · Callisto

Plot of vertical position y vs time t of the animation above.

=== Latest flyby ===
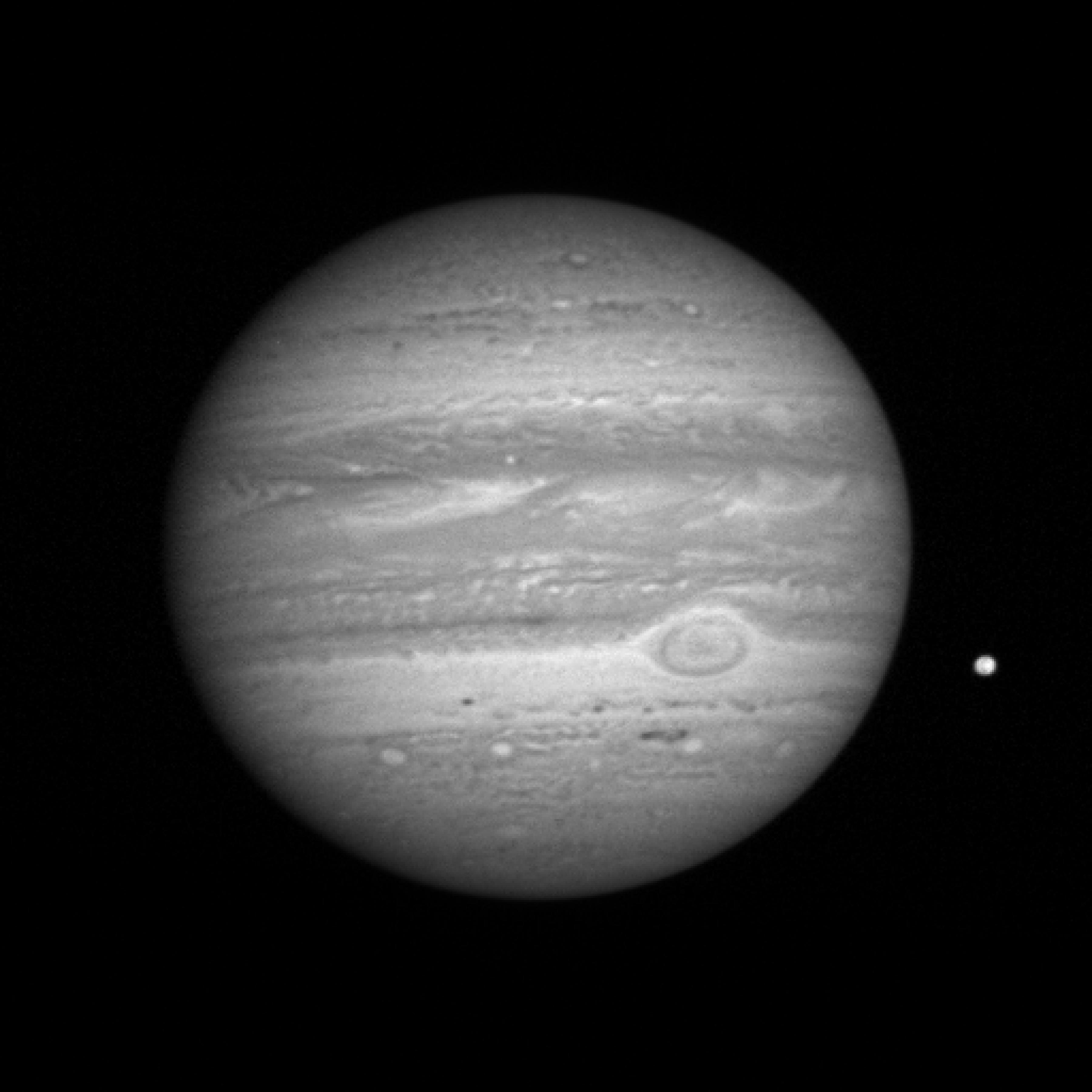
Jupiter and Io

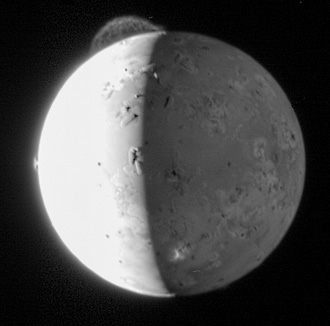
Io

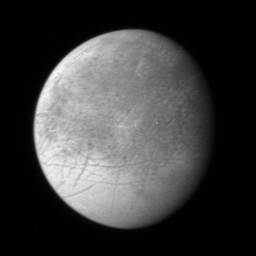
Europa

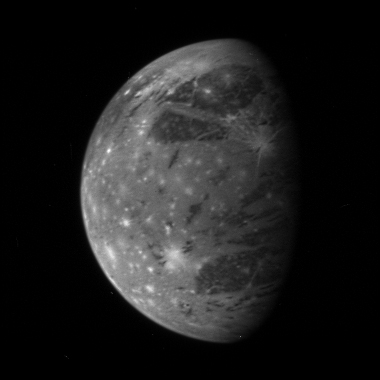
Ganymede

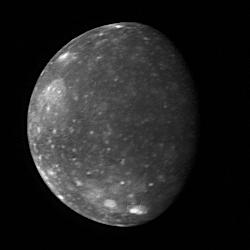
Callisto

Jupiter and Galilean moons circa 2007, imaged by New Horizons during flyby. (greyscale colour)

== See also ==
- Jupiter's moons in fiction
- Colonization of the Jovian System
