= Treatise on Astrology of the Kaiyuan Era =

Chinese astrology encyclopedia

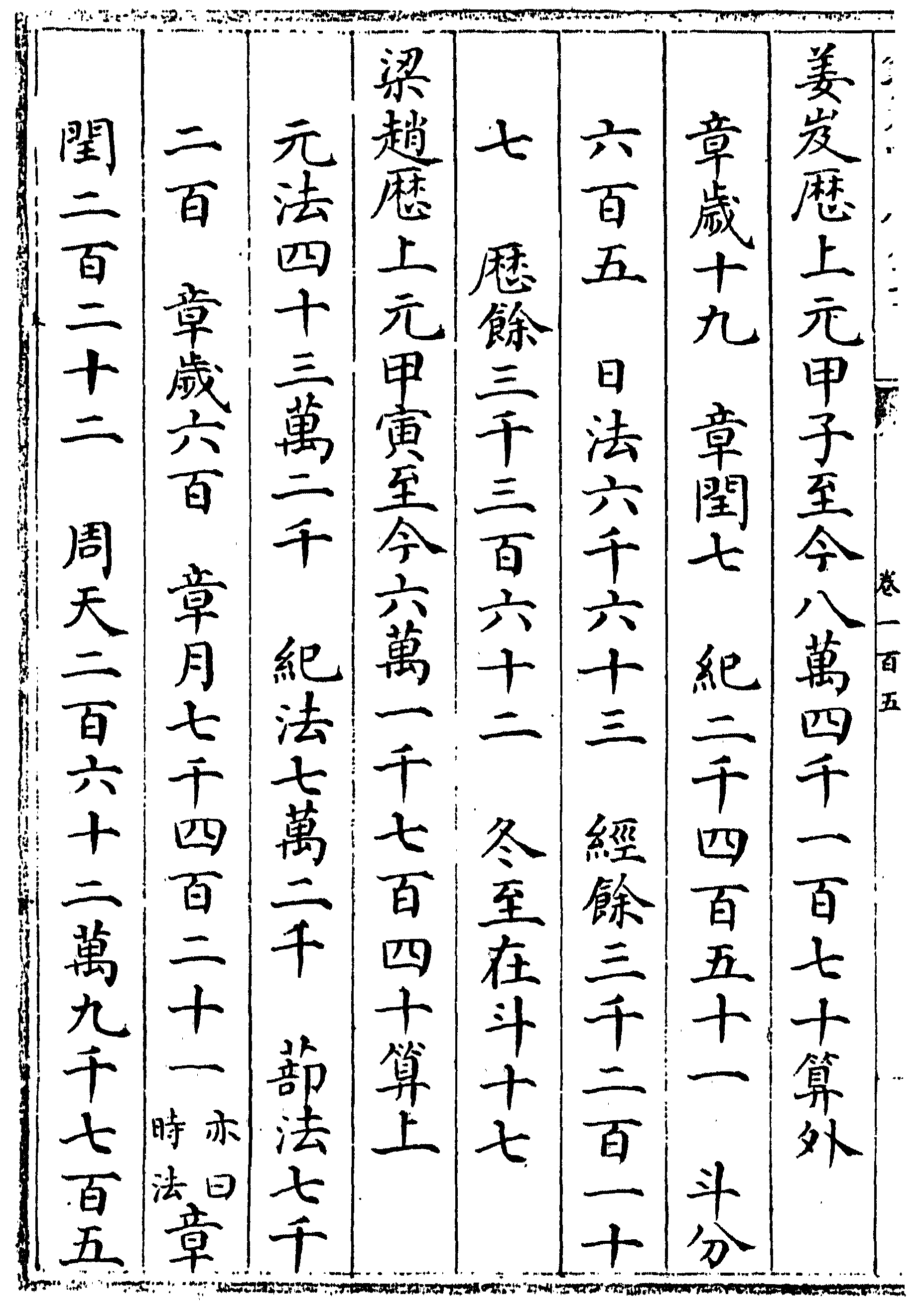
- Volume 105 of the Treatise on Astrology of the Kaiyuan Era, on calendars
- Traditional Chinese: 開元占經
- Simplified Chinese: 开元占经
Transcriptions
Standard Mandarin
- Hanyu Pinyin: Kāiyuán Zhānjīng

The Great Tang Treatise on Astrology of the Kaiyuan Era, also called the Kaiyuan Star Observations (Kaiyuan Zhanjing), is a Chinese astrology encyclopedia compiled by Gautama Siddha and a team of scholars between 714 and 724 AD during the Kaiyuan era of the Tang dynasty.

The book is divided into 120 volumes and consists of about 600,000 words. The Kaiyuan Zhanjing incorporates many fragments of other works, including the star catalogues of Shi Shen and Gan De and a translated version of Indian Navagraha calendar at chapter 104. It may have made use of the Yisizhan, compiled by Li Chunfeng around 645. Aryabhata's sine table by the eponymous Indian astronomer, was also translated into the Kaiyuan Zhanjing.

The Kaiyuan Zhanjing ceased to be copied in the 10th century, but received attention from the scholar Cheng Mingshan in 1616 and was later included in the Complete Library of the Four Treasuries collections of the 18th century.
