= Eiji Sasaki =

Japanese businessman

Eiji Sasaki (佐々木 英治, Sasaki Eiji, 23 August 1915 – 15 December 2007) was a Japanese businessman, former Vice President of Ube Industries and former President of TYS.

== Early life and education ==
Eiji Sasaki was born in Yamaguchi-shi, Yamaguchi in August 1915. He attended Yamaguchi Senior High School and then graduated from Kyoto University with a degree in economics.

== Career ==
In 1940, Eiji Sasaki started his career joining Okinoyama Tanko a coal mining company (沖ノ山炭鉱 – the company later became Ube Tanko and then was absorbed into Ube Industries in 1944). In 1969 was promoted to the board of directors of TYS and board of director of Ube Industries. In 1983 he was promoted to Executive Vice President of Ube Industries and in 1984 was made President of TYS. During his career Eiji Sasaki worked on projects to support the infrastructure of Ube City such as the UBE Kohsan Central Hospital and Yamaguchi-Ube Airport.

== Awards and honors ==
- In April 1998 Eiji Sasaki was awarded the Order of the Sacred Treasure (瑞宝章 Zuihō-shō) 3rd Class (勲三等瑞宝章).
