= Huang Shang =

Huang Shang (1146–1195) styled Wenshu was a Chinese polymath cartographer and high ranking Chinese official.

He created a map of the stars also known as the Suzhou Star Chart. He is also credited with creating one of the first maps of China, known as the "Dili Tu", in 1193 as a woodcarving. Both were transferred to stone in 1247, from which rubbings survive.

Huang studied for Imperial exams eventually passing jinshi level. Eventually under the Guangzong emperor as Imperial Secretary (1189–1194). Shang was a tutor to a Young Prince (future emperor Zhao Kao) in 1190 for whom he produced eight maps including the woodcarving the Dili Tu. Shang produced the "Dili Tu"" and the star chart to show China as the centre of the world with the aim of unifying the split Northern Jin dynasty and the Southern song empire. Eventually serving the Ningzong Emperor as Imperial tutor and Minister of Rites. Huang was known as a Neo-Confucianist.
