= Gautama Siddha =

8th-century Indian-Chinese astronomer

Gautama Siddha (fl. 8th century) was an astronomer, astrologer and compiler of Indian descent, known for leading the compilation of the Treatise on Astrology of the Kaiyuan Era during the Tang dynasty. He was born in Chang'an, and his family was originally from India, according to a tomb stele uncovered in 1977 in Xi'an. The Gautama family had lived in China for multiple generations, ever since his great-grandfather immigrated to China from India. He was most notable for his translation of Navagraha calendar into Chinese.

The '〇' is used to write zero in Suzhou numerals, which is the only surviving variation of the rod numeral system. The Mathematical Treatise in Nine Sections, written by Qin Jiushao in 1247, is the oldest surviving Chinese mathematical text to use the character ‘〇’ for zero. The origin of using the character '〇' to represent zero is unknown. Gautama Siddha introduced Hindu numerals with zero in 718 CE, but Chinese mathematicians did not find them useful, as they already had the decimal positional counting rods. Some historians suggest that the use of '〇' for zero was influenced by Indian numerals imported by Gautama, but Gautama’s numeral system represented zero with a dot rather than a hollow circle, similar to the Bakhshali manuscript. An alternative hypothesis proposes that the use of '〇' to represent zero arose from a modification of the Chinese text space filler "□", making its resemblance to Indian numeral systems purely coincidental. Others think that the Indians acquired the symbol '〇' from China, because it resembles a Confucian philosophical symbol for "nothing".
