= Gan De =

4th-century BC Chinese astronomer and astrologer

- Chinese: 甘德
Transcriptions
Standard Mandarin
- Hanyu Pinyin: Gān Dé
- Wade–Giles: Kan^{1} Te^{2}
- IPA: [kán tɤ̌]

Gan De (Chinese: 甘德; fl. 4th century BC), also known as the Lord Gan (Gan Gong), was an ancient Chinese astronomer and astrologer born in the State of Qi. Along with Shi Shen, he is believed to be the first in history known by name to compile a star catalogue, preceded by the anonymous authors of the early Babylonian star catalogues and followed by the Greek Hipparchus who is the first known in the Western tradition of Hellenistic astronomy to have compiled a star catalogue. He also made observations of the planets, particularly Jupiter. His writings are lost, but some of his works' titles and fragments quoted from them are known from later texts.

Gan De may have been the first to describe one of the Galilean moons of Jupiter, usually invisible without the aid of telescopes. In the 20th century, a fragment of Gan's work, in a later compilation of astronomical texts, was identified by Xi Zezong as describing a naked-eye observation of either of the two largest and brightest moons, Ganymede or Callisto in summer 365 BC.

== Life ==
Gan was one of the earliest practitioners of Chinese astronomy. As the earliest attempt to document the sky during the Warring States period, Gan De's work possesses high scientific value. He wrote two books, the Treatise on Jupiter and the 8-volume Treatise on Astronomical Astrology. Gan De also wrote the Astronomic Star Observation (天文星占, Tianwen xingzhan).

Shen and Gan together made fairly detailed observations of the five major planets during the 4th century. Gan De made some of the first detailed observations of Jupiter in recorded history.

== Works ==
All Gan's writings are lost, but some fragments are preserved in the Great Tang Treatise on Astrology of the Kaiyuan Era (Kai Yuan Zhan Jing), an 8th-century CE text whose compilation dates to the period between 718 and 726, and the titles of two treatises – On Jupiter (Sui Xing Jing) and Astronomical Star Prognostication (Tian Wen Xing Zhan) – are known. Other fragments of Gan's work exist as quotations in the Records of the Grand Historian (Shiji; volume 27) and the Book of Han (Hanshu; volume 26), but most of his surviving corpus was preserved in the Treatise on Astrology of the Kaiyuan Era.

=== Celestial comparisons ===
Shi Shen and Gan De divided the celestial sphere into 365 1/4°, as a tropical year has 365 1/4 days. At the time, most ancient astronomers adopted the Babylon division where the celestial sphere is divided by 360°.

=== Planetary periodic comparisons ===
Planet	Period	Predictions by Gan and Shi	Modern day calculation
Jupiter	sidereal period	12 years	11.862615 years
Venus	synodic period	587.25 days	583.92 days
Mercury	synodic period	136 days	115.88 days

=== Satellite of Jupiter ===
Chapter 23 of the Treatise on Astrology of the Kaiyuan Era, which details the apparent positions of Jupiter during the course of a conjectural twelve year sidereal period (in reality 11.9 years), quotes Gan's notes on the "stars" observed in 365 BC, when Jupiter appeared in the lunar station of the constellation Aquarius, the Chinese lunar mansion of Wēi:

"In the year of chan yan . . . , Jupiter was in Zi, it rose in the morning and went under in the evening together with the lunar mansions Nǚ, Xū and Wēi. It was very large and bright. Apparently, there was a small reddish star appended to its side. This is called 'an alliance'."

— Treatise on Astrology of the Kaiyuan Era, xxiii

The historian and astronomer Xi Zezong published a paper in 1981 in Acta Astrophysica Sinica identifying the "small reddish star" with one of the Galilean moons of Jupiter, an interpretation hitherto unrecognized. Xi used the Beijing Planetarium to simulate the brightnesses of Jupiter and its moons in their relative positions from the earth as reported in the astronomical publications of Bryant Tuckerman and Clabon Allen's Astrophysical Quantities. He concluded that the Galiean moons of Jupiter are visible to the human eye under good conditions, and that Gan's report was an accurate account of a naked-eye observation of either Callisto or Ganymede – the two brightest and most visibly distinct moons – in summer 364 BC= 9637HE.

Since Ganymede is larger and brighter than is Callisto, Xi reasoned that it was likely Ganymede to which Gan's "small reddish star" refers. Writing in Nature in 1982, the astronomer David Hughes pointed out that William Henry Smyth had recorded reports of Jupiter's moons visible with the naked eye in exceptional conditions in particular places. Smyth wrote in 1844 that sightings of the moons typically mentioned the Apennine Mountains and Mount Etna in Italy and the Caribbean "and various other fine-climate places as the spots where such a feat is frequently done" by those endowed with "visual organs of extraordinary power". Galileo Galilei, describing his discovery using refracting telescopes of "four planets swiftly revolving about Jupiter at differing distances and periods" (the Galilean moons), was therefore unlikely to have been correct to write in his Sidereus Nuncius, published in 1610, that these bodies were "known to no one before the Author recently perceived them". By occluding Jupiter itself behind a high tree limb perpendicular to the satellites' orbital plane to prevent the planet's glare from obscuring them, one or more of the Galilean moons might be spotted in favorable conditions.

However, the description of the "small reddish star" is not explained; it is not known why Gan might have referred to either moon as "reddish" (赤 chi, a light red colour), since neither's colour is distinguishable by the human eye alone, and even using a telescope their colour appears uniform with Jupiter's.

== Related texts ==
In 1973, a similar catalogue by Gan De and Shi Shen was uncovered within the Mawangdui Silk Texts. Arranged under the name of Divination of Five Planets, it records the motion of Jupiter, Saturn, Venus and other planets in their orbits between 246 BC and 177 BC.

== See also ==
- Chinese star maps
- Galileo Galilei
- Hipparchus
- Nicolaus Copernicus
