= Shi Shen =

Chinese astronomer and astrologer

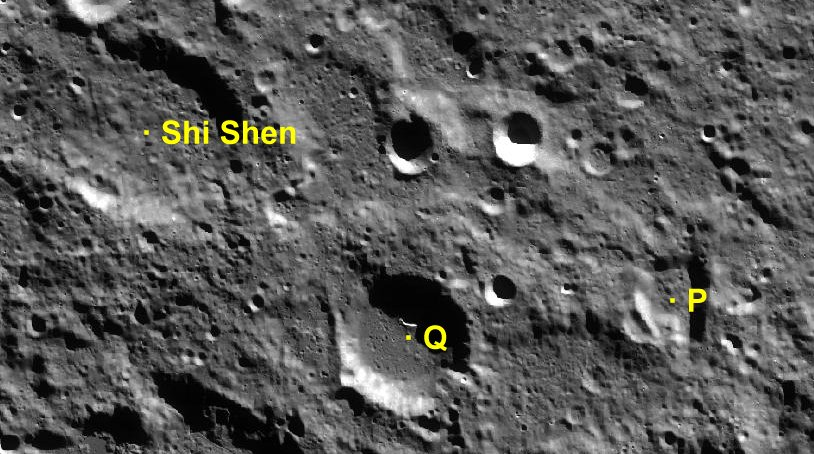
ShiShen crater (top left). The crater was named after Shi Shen.

Shi Shen (Chinese: 石申; Wade–Giles: Shih Shen, fl. 4th century BC) was a Chinese astronomer and astrologer. He was a contemporary of Gan De born in the State of Wei, also known as the Shi Shenfu.

== Observations ==
Shi is credited with positioning the 121 stars found in the preserved texts. Shen also made the earliest surviving deliberate sunspot observation, sometimes erroneously credited to Gan De. He assumed that these spots were eclipses that began at the center of the Sun and spread outward. Although he was wrong, he recognised the spots for what they were – solar phenomena.

His works included the 8-volume The rocks of Space, the one-volume Celestial Map and the one-volume Star Catalogue of Shi. The latter two are now believed to be written by his school followers. Most of his works did not survive intact, but a few of his crucial writings were preserved in the Treatise on Astrology of the Kaiyuan Era.

== Books ==
Shi Shen wrote the Astronomy (石氏天文, Shishi Tianwen), later known as Shi's Classic of Stars (石氏星經, Shishi Xingjing).

== Influence ==
Gan De and Shi Shen are widely quoted across a number of astronomical texts after their time, though they should not be confused with other books sharing similar names that were not written by them. One example is the Star Manual of the Masters Gan and Shi (甘石星經, Gan Shi Xingjing), which was actually compiled by Ma Xian (馬顯) circa 579 AD as an appendix to a calendar treatise.

The crater Shi Shen on the Moon is named after him.

== See also ==
- Chinese star maps
- Galileo Galilei
- Hipparchus
- Nicolaus Copernicus
