= Chang Hung =

Chang Hung may refer to:

- Chang Hong (died 492 BC), scholar, politician, educator and astronomer in ancient China
- Zhang Hong (disambiguation)
- Zhang Heng (disambiguation)
