= Zhang Heng (disambiguation) =

Zhang Heng (AD 78–139) was a Chinese astronomer and mathematician who lived in the early Eastern Han dynasty.

Zhang Heng may also refer to:

- 1802 Zhang Heng, an asteroid named after the astronomer
- Zhang Heng (張橫), a minor warlord involved in the Battle of Tong Pass (211) in the late Eastern Han dynasty
- Zhang Heng (Water Margin), a fictional character and one of the 108 outlaws in the novel Water Margin
- Zhang Heng (Taoist), one of the leaders of the Way of the Five Pecks of Rice
- Zhang Heng (rugby player), rugby player who won a medal in rugby sevens at the 2006 Asian Games

== See also ==
- Chang Heng (crater), a lunar crater named after the astronomer
