= AD 167 =

167 in various calendars
- Gregorian calendar: 167; CLXVII
- Ab urbe condita: 920
- Assyrian calendar: 4917
- Balinese saka calendar: 88–89
- Bengali calendar: −427 – −426
- Berber calendar: 1117
- Buddhist calendar: 711
- Burmese calendar: −471
- Byzantine calendar: 5675–5676
- Chinese calendar: 丙午年 (Fire Horse); 2864 or 2657 — to — 丁未年 (Fire Goat); 2865 or 2658
- Coptic calendar: −117 – −116
- Discordian calendar: 1333
- Ethiopian calendar: 159–160
- Hebrew calendar: 3927–3928
- Hindu calendars
- Vikram Samvat: 223–224
- Shaka Samvat: 88–89
- Kali Yuga: 3267–3268
- Holocene calendar: 10167
- Iranian calendar: 455 BP – 454 BP
- Islamic calendar: 469 BH – 468 BH
- Javanese calendar: 43–44
- Julian calendar: 167; CLXVII
- Korean calendar: 2500
- Minguo calendar: 1745 before ROC 民前1745年
- Nanakshahi calendar: −1301
- Seleucid era: 478/479 AG
- Thai solar calendar: 709–710
- Tibetan calendar: མེ་ཕོ་རྟ་ལོ་ (male Fire-Horse); 293 or −88 or −860 — to — མེ་མོ་ལུག་ལོ་ (female Fire-Sheep); 294 or −87 or −859

Year 167 (CLXVII) was a common year starting on Wednesday of the Julian calendar. At the time, it was known as the Year of the Consulship of Aurelius and Quadratus (or, less frequently, year 920 Ab urbe condita). The denomination 167 for this year has been used since the early medieval period, when the Anno Domini calendar era became the prevalent method in Europe for naming years.

== Events ==
=== By place ===
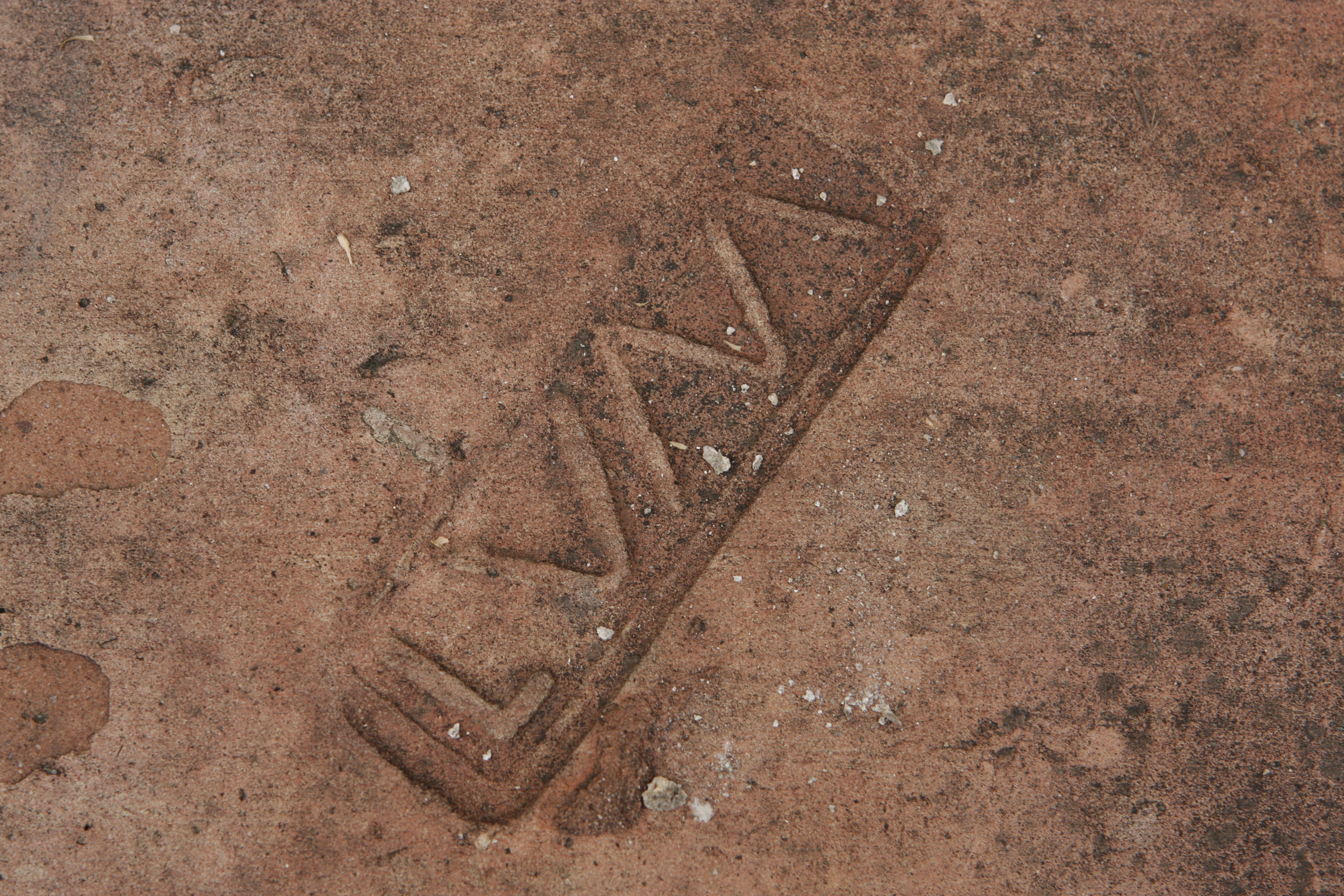
Legio V Macedonica marked brick from Potaissa (modern Turda, Romania)

==== Roman Empire ====
- Lucius Aurelius Verus Augustus and Marcus Ummidius Quadratus Annianus become Roman Consuls.
- The Marcomanni tribe wages war against the Romans at Aquileia. They destroy aqueducts and irrigation conduits. Marcus Aurelius repels the invaders, ending the Pax Romana (Roman Peace) that has kept the Roman Empire free of conflict since the days of Emperor Augustus.
- The Vandals (Astingi and Lacringi) and the Sarmatian Iazyges invade Dacia. To counter them, Legio V Macedonica, returning from the Parthian War, moves its headquarters from Troesmis in Moesia Inferior to Potaissa in Dacia Porolissensis.
- The Germans devastate the Balkans and ransack the sanctuary of Eleusis, near Athens.

==== Asia ====
- Change of era name from Yanxi to Yongkang of the Chinese Han dynasty.
- King Chogo of Baekje wages war against Silla in the Korean Peninsula.

== Births ==
- Zhang Yi (or Junsi), Chinese official (d. 230)

== Deaths ==
- Abercius, bishop of Hieropolis (approximate date)
- Anicetus, pope of Rome (approximate date)
- Wang Fu, Chinese philosopher (b. AD 82)
