= AD 82 =

AD 82 in various calendars
- Gregorian calendar: AD 82; LXXXII
- Ab urbe condita: 835
- Assyrian calendar: 4832
- Balinese saka calendar: 3–4
- Bengali calendar: −512 – −511
- Berber calendar: 1032
- Buddhist calendar: 626
- Burmese calendar: −556
- Byzantine calendar: 5590–5591
- Chinese calendar: 辛巳年 (Metal Snake); 2779 or 2572 — to — 壬午年 (Water Horse); 2780 or 2573
- Coptic calendar: −202 – −201
- Discordian calendar: 1248
- Ethiopian calendar: 74–75
- Hebrew calendar: 3842–3843
- Hindu calendars
- Vikram Samvat: 138–139
- Shaka Samvat: 3–4
- Kali Yuga: 3182–3183
- Holocene calendar: 10082
- Iranian calendar: 540 BP – 539 BP
- Islamic calendar: 557 BH – 556 BH
- Javanese calendar: N/A
- Julian calendar: AD 82; LXXXII
- Korean calendar: 2415
- Minguo calendar: 1830 before ROC 民前1830年
- Nanakshahi calendar: −1386
- Seleucid era: 393/394 AG
- Thai solar calendar: 624–625
- Tibetan calendar: ལྕགས་མོ་སྦྲུལ་ལོ་ (female Iron-Snake); 208 or −173 or −945 — to — ཆུ་ཕོ་རྟ་ལོ་ (male Water-Horse); 209 or −172 or −944

AD 82 (LXXXII) was a common year starting on Tuesday of the Julian calendar. At the time, it was known as the Year of the Consulship of Augustus and Sabinus (or, less frequently, year 835 Ab urbe condita). The denomination AD 82 for this year has been used since the early medieval period, when the Anno Domini calendar era became the prevalent method in Europe for naming years.

== Events ==
=== By place ===
==== Roman Empire ====
- Emperor Domitian becomes Roman Consul.
- Gnaeus Julius Agricola raises a fleet, and encircles the Celtic tribes beyond the Forth; the Caledonians rise in great numbers against the Romans. They attack the camp of Legio IX Hispana at night, but Agricola sends his cavalry in, and puts them to flight.
- Calgacus unites the Picts (30,000 men) in Scotland, and is made chieftain of the Caledonian Confederacy.
- Dio Chrysostom is banished from Rome, Italy, and Bithynia, after advising one of the Emperor's conspiring relatives.
- Domitian levies Legio I Minervia.

== Births ==
- Wang Fu, Chinese historian and philosopher (d. 167)

== Deaths ==
- Anianus, Patriarch of Alexandria
