= Cui Yuan =

Cui Yuan may refer to:

- Cui Yuan (Han dynasty) (77–142 or 78–143), officer and scholar during the Han dynasty
- Cui Yuan (705–768), Tang dynasty politician, chief councilor during the reigns of Emperor Xuanzong and Emperor Suzong
- Cui Yuan (died 905), Tang dynasty politician, chief councilor during the reigns of Emperor Zhaozong and Emperor Ai
