= Akitsune Imamura =

Japanese seismologist (1870 – 1948)

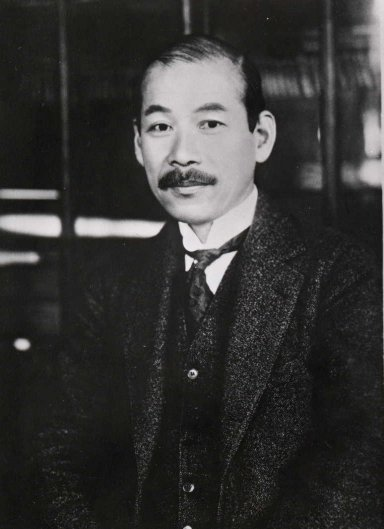
- Akitsune Imamura
- Born: June 14, 1870; Japan Kagoshima
- Died: January 1, 1948 (aged 77)
- Scientific career
- Fields: Seismology
- Workplaces: University of Tokyo

Akitsune Imamura (今村 明恒, Imamura Akitsune; Kagoshima, 14 June 1870 – 1 January 1948) was a Japanese seismologist. As a University of Tokyo seismologist he represented a new generation of scientists, trained by Western experts. He predicted the timing and magnitude of the 1923 Great Kantō earthquake 16 years in advance.

== Biography ==
Akitsune Imamura was born in Kagoshima. His father was the Samurai of Satsuma Domain, but the family was poor. But he hoped to study, and received education in the First Higher School after secondary school. In 1891, he entered the Tokyo Imperial University. He majored in physics, but studied in the seismological seminar after getting the bachelor's degree.

He became an assistant professor at his alma mater. In 1899, in anticipation of the later theory of plate tectonics, he argued that the tsunami that struck the Sanriku coast of Honshū island in 1896 (known as the Meiji Sanriku tsunami) had been triggered by movements of the Earth's crust under the sea. In a paper written in 1905, he predicted that a major earthquake would hit the Kantō region around Tokyo within 50 years and kill over 100,000 people, and advocated that measures be taken. His worries materialized when the Great Kantō earthquake devastated Tokyo in 1923, claiming more than 100,000 victims.

In 1939, while working for the Seismological Observatory of Tokyo University, Imamura made a reconstruction of Zhang Heng's seismoscope (132 CE), considered to have been the first such device ever made.

== Contributions ==
He re-established the Seismological Society of Japan.
