= Zhang Hong =

Zhang Hong is the name of:

- Zhang Hong (Han dynasty) (153–212), Han-era official and scholar under the warlords Sun Ce and Sun Quan
- Zhang Hong (handballer) (born 1966), Chinese handball player
- Zhang Hong (speed skater) (born 1988), Chinese speed skater
- Hong Zhang (scientist), Chinese-born robotics researcher at the University of Alberta, Canada
- Arnold Chang (aka Zhang Hong) (born 1954), American painter and calligrapher

== See also ==
- Zhanghong (张洪), a town in Xunyi County, Shaanxi, China
