= Wang Zhenduo =

Chinese archaeologist and politician (1911–1992)

Wang Zhenduo

Wang Zhenduo (Chinese: 王振铎, 1911–1992), whose courtesy name was Tianmu (天木), was a Chinese historian, archaeologist and museologist, and is considered one of the founders of the history of Chinese technology.

== Early life and education ==
Wang was born in Baoding, Hebei Province into a wealthy land-owning family. His father, Wang Zongxi, was a military engineer and his grandfather, Wang Yingkai, was a high ranking Qing Dynasty general. He graduated from Yanjing University in 1934.

== Study of Chinese technology ==
Wang was noted for his contributions to the understanding of ancient Chinese technology, including his 1936 reconstruction of Zhang Heng's seismograph.

== Politics ==
Wang was elected to the third National People's Congress, and the fifth, sixth and seventh Chinese People's Political Consultative Conference.
