= Wang Fu (Han dynasty) =

2nd-century Chinese philosopher

Wang Fu (Chinese: 王符; pinyin: Wáng Fú; about 82 AD – 167 AD), courtesy name Jiexin (simplified Chinese: 节信; traditional Chinese: 節信; pinyin: Jiéxìn) was a Chinese essayist, historian, philosopher, and poet during the Eastern Han dynasty. Born in Gansu Province, Wang Fu was a studious and knowledgeable man of humble birth. Once he was discriminated by fellow villagers in youth and was later not recommended to the Court as a government official. There is little information left about him, but his only masterpiece, Qianfu Lun, is a most valuable source. Nowadays, scholars have begun to attach importance to him, but the study is confined by the lack of historical records.

== Life and times ==
Wang Fu was born in present-day Gansu Province. There are many statements about his birth and death dates, but a popularly accepted verification is from 82 to 167. Wang Fu was an acquaintance of Ma Rong, Dou Zhang (窦章), Zhang Heng, and Cui Yuan, all of them well known, two of them rich and powerful, the other two government officials, but none of them tried to recommend him for an official position. While Wang Fu's failure to be appointed as a government official might be his illegitimate birth and/or the lack of officials ready to recommend him, a more likely reason was the irreversible decline of the Eastern Han dynasty. Instead Wang Fu led the life of a recluse and called himself Qianfu (潜夫), which is a Chinese term for recluse. In the reign of the Emperor Huan of Han, Wang Fu began to compose Qianfu Lun.

== Qianfu Lun and philosophy ==
Qianfu Lun (Critical Essays of Qianfu) was Wang Fu's life-work, composed of 36 chapters in 10 volumes. All his philosophical, political, economic and military ideas were expounded in this book. Although Qianfu Lun was changed and misunderstood during the process of transmission, famous scholars rectified the faults and translated it into modern Chinese. Nowadays, it is still the main resource for the study of Wang Fu.

Although the book includes discussion of law, it was classified as Confucian.

== Heavenly Law, Human Law and Reigning Law ==
Wang Fu was a mixture of Confucianist, Taoist and Legalist. He believed that the Primary Qi was the origin of the universe (元气本原论) and the universe, the Primary Qi, evolved itself (莫制莫御 翻化自然), which was the major part of his Heavenly Law (also called Cosmic View). Wang Fu once said that what Heaven and Earth both value was human beings (天地之所贵者人也) and that Human Law was acting/doing (人道约为). According to his Cosmic View, Wang Fu developed his Human Law, and based on his Human Law, the Reigning Law came into its own. His Reigning Law included political ideas, economic ideas, military ideas, legal ideas and ethical ideas. His political ideas appealed to a people-oriented government.

Since agriculture had been neglected after Zhangdi, Wang Fu explained his economic ideas as a policy of physiocracy, the restriction of trade (重农抑商) and taking farmers’ time seriously (为民爱日). The Eastern Han dynasty fought frequently against the Qiang people, but lost many battles. Consequently, the rulers abandoned the frontier zones and forced farmers there further inside away from the frontiers. In his system of military ideas, Wang Fu criticised the policy-makers and put forward the ideas that land was the paramount necessity of farmers and that the inland settlers should move to the frontiers under the protection of armies (为民实边). Wang Fu's legal ideas were very advanced and comprehensive, involving all classes. He was a gracious and noble-minded intellectual and his ethical ideas also covered many aspects, even antenatal training. The term 'paramount' is thought to have originated with Wang Fu, as there is no earlier textual reference to this ideology. The teaching of 'paramount necessity' and bringing this with the farm occupies a central part in his political motive.

== Influence ==
Wang Fu was an ideological pioneer of the social critical thoughts of the Eastern Han dynasty and the pioneer of the ontology about Qi of Neo-Confucianism.

Nowadays, there still exists a Qianfu Shan (Qianfu Mount), located north of the county seat of Zhenyuan County in memory of Wang Fu, on which Qianfu Mu (Qianfu Tomb) and Qianfu Ting (Qianfu Pavilion) are frequented by scholars, visitors and locals. Articles and books about Wang Fu have been increasing since the 1980s. The local government is determined to introduce Wang Fu to the world. Important studies have been made by the local scholars with the support of the government.

== Sources ==
- Gao, Xinmin. Wang Fu ji qi Qainfu Lun: Qingyang wenhua mingren yanjiu [Wang Fu & Qainfu Lun: the Study of Cultural Celebrity in Qingyang]. Zhongguo Qingyang zhengfu wang. 21 Jan. 2010.【庆阳文化名人研究】王符及其《潜夫论》--
- Kinney, Anne Behnke (1990). The Art of the Han Essay: Wang Fu's Ch'ien-Fu Lun. Phoenix: Arizona State University Center for Asian Research. ISBN 0-939252-23-6.
- Li, Guangyong. "Shilun minben sixiang zai Wang Fu sixiang tixi zhong de diwei [ On the Role of People-oriented Thinking in Wang Fu’s Ideological System ]." Gansu shehui kexue [Gansu Social Sciences]. 3. 1993. Print.
- Liu, Wenqi. Wang Fu ‘Qianfu Lun’ suo fanying zhi donghan qingshi. Taipei: Tanwan wenshizhe chubanshe, 1995. (trans. Liu, Wenqi. The Situation of the Eastern Han Dynasty Reflected by Wangfu’ Qianfu Lun. Taipei: Literature, History & Philosophy Press, 1995.
- Qinqi. “Wang Fu de shehui pipan sixiang yu donghan monian qiyi sichao [Wang Fu’s Social Critical Thoughts & the Trend of Self-help Movement during the Late Han Dynasty]." Gansu shehui kexue [Gansu Social Sciences]. 3. 1993. Print.
- Twitchett, Denis and Loewe, Michael. The Cambridge History of China Volume 1: the Ch’in and Han Empires, B.C.221-A.D.220. Cambridge: Cambridge University Press, December 1986. p. 707–708.
- Wang, Bugui.Wang Fu pingzhuan. Xi’an: Shanxi renmin jiaoyu chubanshe, 1983. (trans. Wang, Bugui. A Critical Biography of Wang Fu. Xi’an: Shaanxi People's Education Press,1983.)
- Xu Fuguan. Lianghan sixiang shi (Juan 1,2,3.). Taipei: Tanwan xuesheng shuju, 1991, 2000, 1994. (trans. Xu Fuguan. The Ideological History of the Western and Eastern Han Dynasties (volume 1,2,3.). Taipei: Taiwan Student Book Co., Ltd, 1991, 2000, 1994.)
