= Hong Zhang (scientist) =

Hong Zhang (Chinese: 张宏; pinyin: Zhāng Hóng) is an electrical engineer from the University of Alberta in Edmonton. He was named a Fellow of the Institute of Electrical and Electronics Engineers (IEEE) in 2014 for his contributions to collective robotics and intelligent sensing in oil sand mining.
