= Chang Heng (crater) =

Crater on the Moon

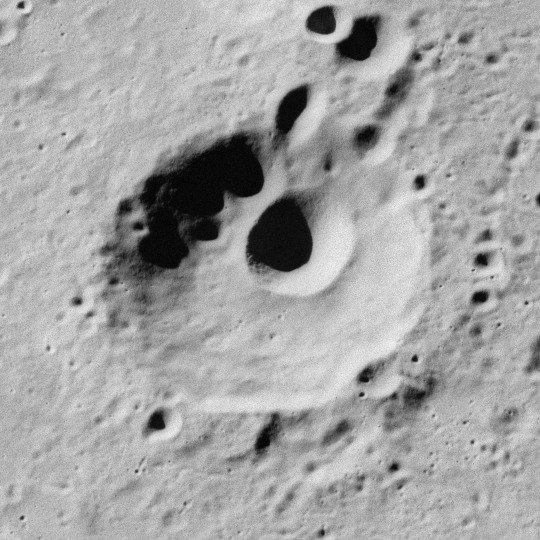
- Oblique Apollo 16 image (facing northwest)
- Coordinates: 19.0°N 112.2°E
- Diameter: 42.65 km (26.50 mi)
- Depth: Unknown
- Colongitude: 248° at sunrise
- Eponym: Zhang Heng

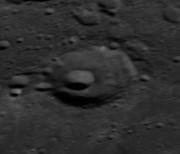
Oblique Apollo 14 Hasselblad camera image (facing east)

Chang Heng is a degraded lunar impact crater that is located on the Moon's far side. It lies less than one crater diameter to the northeast of the walled plain Fleming. The rim of Chang Heng is eroded, with a pair of small craters along the northern rim and tiny craters along the south and east edges. The interior floor contains a small, concentric crater that is about one third the diameter of Chang Heng.

The crater is named after Chinese astronomer Zhang Heng (78–139). This designation was formally adopted by the International Astronomical Union in 1970.

== Satellite craters ==
By convention these features are identified on lunar maps by placing the letter on the side of the crater midpoint that is closest to Chang Heng.

Chang Heng	Latitude	Longitude	Diameter
C	20.4° N	114.0° E	25 km
