= Cui Yuan (Han dynasty) =

2nd-century Chinese writer and politician

Cui Yuan (Chinese: 崔瑗; pinyin: Cuī Yuán; 77–142 or 78–143 AD), courtesy name Ziyu, Chinese calligrapher, mathematician, philosopher, poet, and politician during the Eastern Han dynasty. He was a temporary fugitive who was also known for his many written works, although in political life he became involved in court intrigues which damaged his career.

== Life ==
Cui Yuan was born in the Lecheng Commandery (renamed Anping in 122) in what is now modern Hebei province. He was the son of Cui Yin, who died while Yuan was in his teens. After years of study, he ventured to the Han capital at Luoyang when he was eighteen. There he studied under Jia Kui and befriended notable persons such as the poet and politician Ma Rong (79–166) and the polymathic scientist Zhang Heng (78–139). Cui gained a reputation as a mathematician with his work on reforming the Chinese calendar and as a scholar following his commentary on the I Ching.
