= Water clock =

Timepiece in which time is measured by the flow of liquid into or out of a vessel

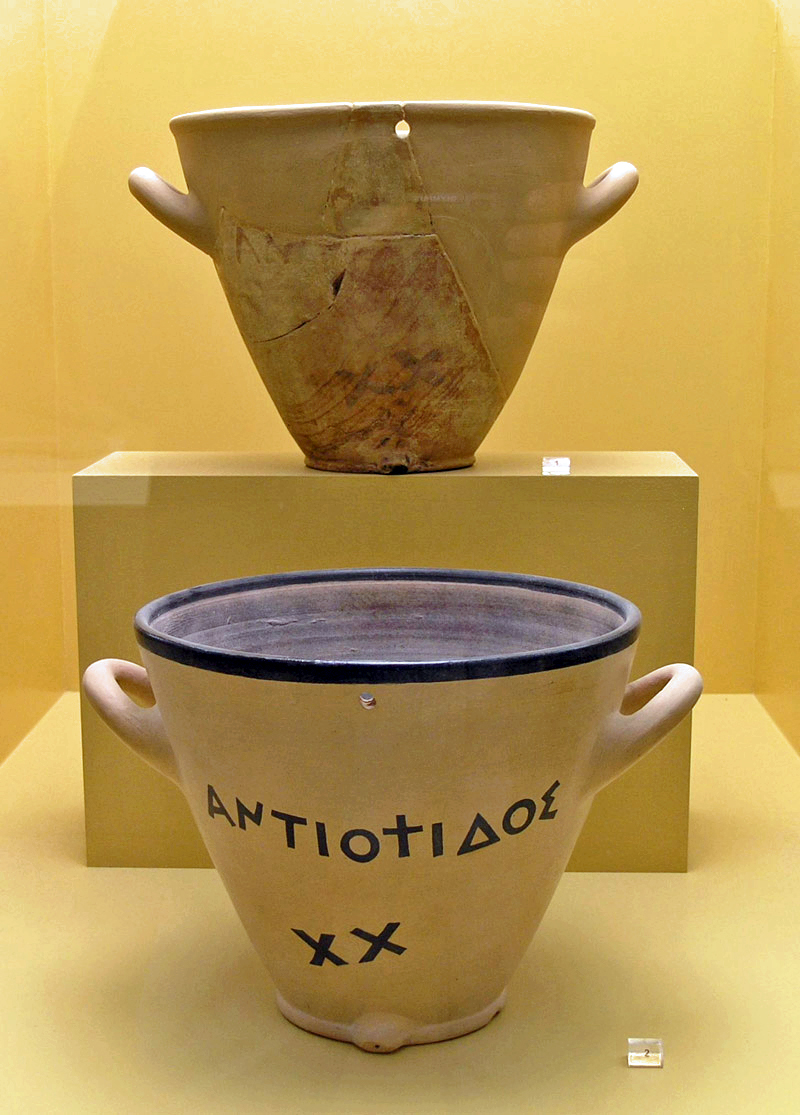
A display of two outflow water clocks from the Ancient Agora Museum in Athens. The top is an original from the late 5th century BC. The bottom is a reconstruction of a clay original.

A water clock, or clepsydra (from Ancient Greek κλεψύδρα (klepsúdra) 'pipette, water clock'; from κλέπτω (kléptō) 'to steal' and ὕδωρ (hydor) 'water'; lit. ' water thief'), is a timepiece by which time is measured by the regulated flow of liquid into (inflow type) or out from (outflow type) a vessel, and where the amount of liquid can then be measured.

Water clocks are some of the oldest time-measuring instruments. The simplest form of water clock, with a bowl-shaped outflow, existed in Babylon, Egypt, and Persia around the 16th century BC. Other regions of the world, including India and China, also provide early evidence of water clocks, but the earliest dates are less certain. Water clocks were used in ancient Greece and in ancient Rome, as described by technical writers such as Ctesibius (died 222 BC) and Vitruvius (died after 15 BC).

== Designs ==
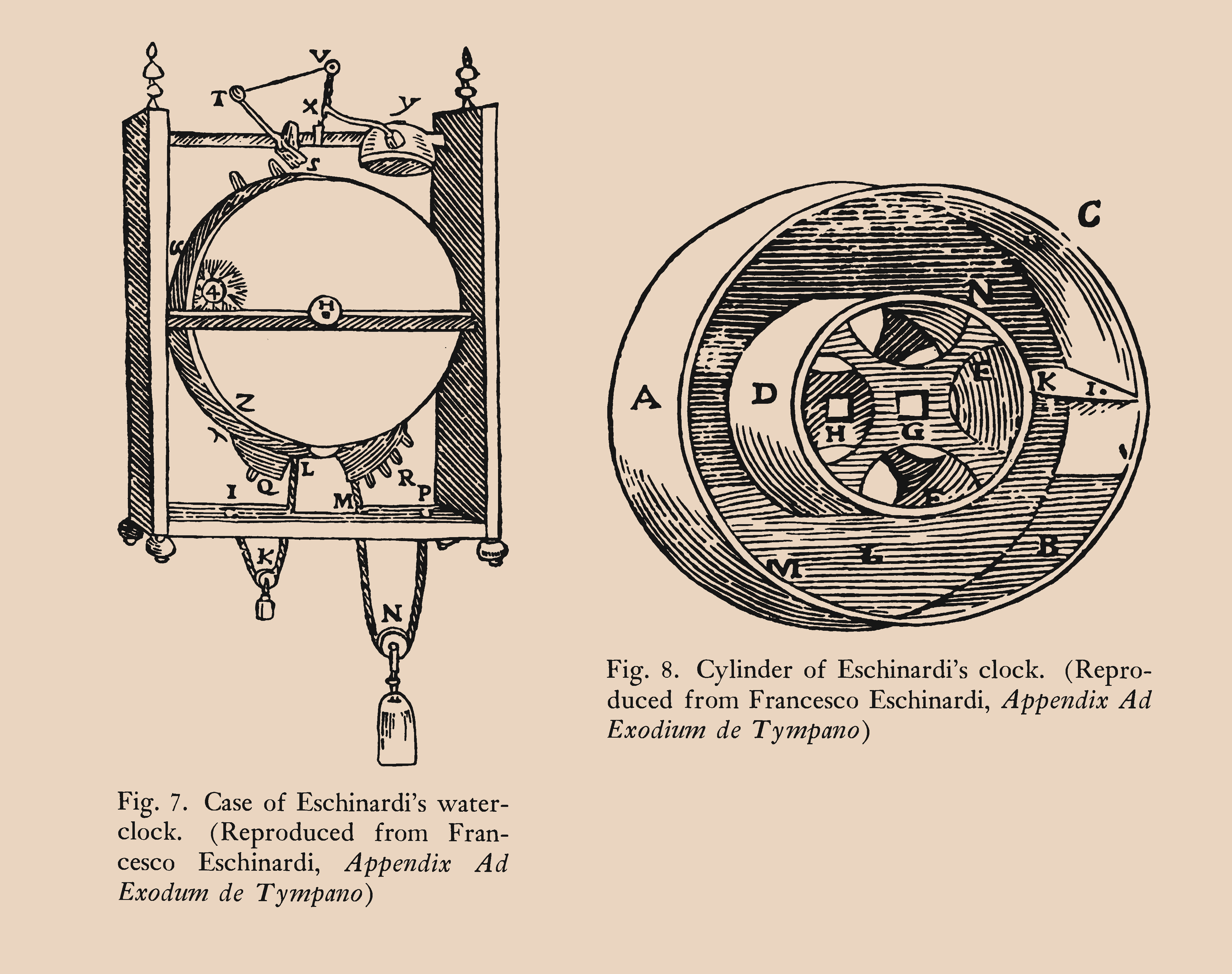
Eschinardi's water clock (Reproduced from Francesco Eschinardi, Appendix Ad Exodium de Tympano)

A water clock uses the flow of water to measure time. If viscosity is neglected, the physical principle required to study such clocks is Torricelli's law. Two types of water clock exist: inflow and outflow. In an outflow water clock, a container is filled with water, and the water is drained slowly and evenly out of the container. This container has markings that are used to show the passage of time. As the water leaves the container, an observer can see where the water is level with the lines and tell how much time has passed. An inflow water clock works in basically the same way, except instead of flowing out of the container, the water is filling up the marked container. As the container fills, the observer can see where the water meets the lines and tell how much time has passed. Some modern timepieces are called "water clocks" but work differently from the ancient ones. Their timekeeping is governed by a pendulum, but they use water for other purposes, such as providing the power needed to drive the clock by using a water wheel or something similar, or by having water in their displays.

The Greeks and Romans advanced water clock design to include the inflow clepsydra with an early feedback system, gearing, and escapement mechanism, which were connected to fanciful automata and resulted in improved accuracy. Further advances were made in Byzantium, Syria, and Mesopotamia, where increasingly accurate water clocks incorporated complex segmental and epicyclic gearing, water wheels, and programmability, advances which eventually made their way to Europe. Independently, the Chinese developed their own advanced water clocks, incorporating gears, escapement mechanisms, and water wheels, passing their ideas on to Korea and Japan.

Some water clock designs were developed independently, and some knowledge was transferred through the spread of trade. These early water clocks were calibrated with a sundial. While never reaching a level of accuracy comparable to today's standards of timekeeping, the water clock was a commonly used timekeeping device for millennia, until it was replaced by more accurate verge escapement mechanical clocks in Europe around 1300.

== Regional development ==
=== Babylon ===
Clay tablet
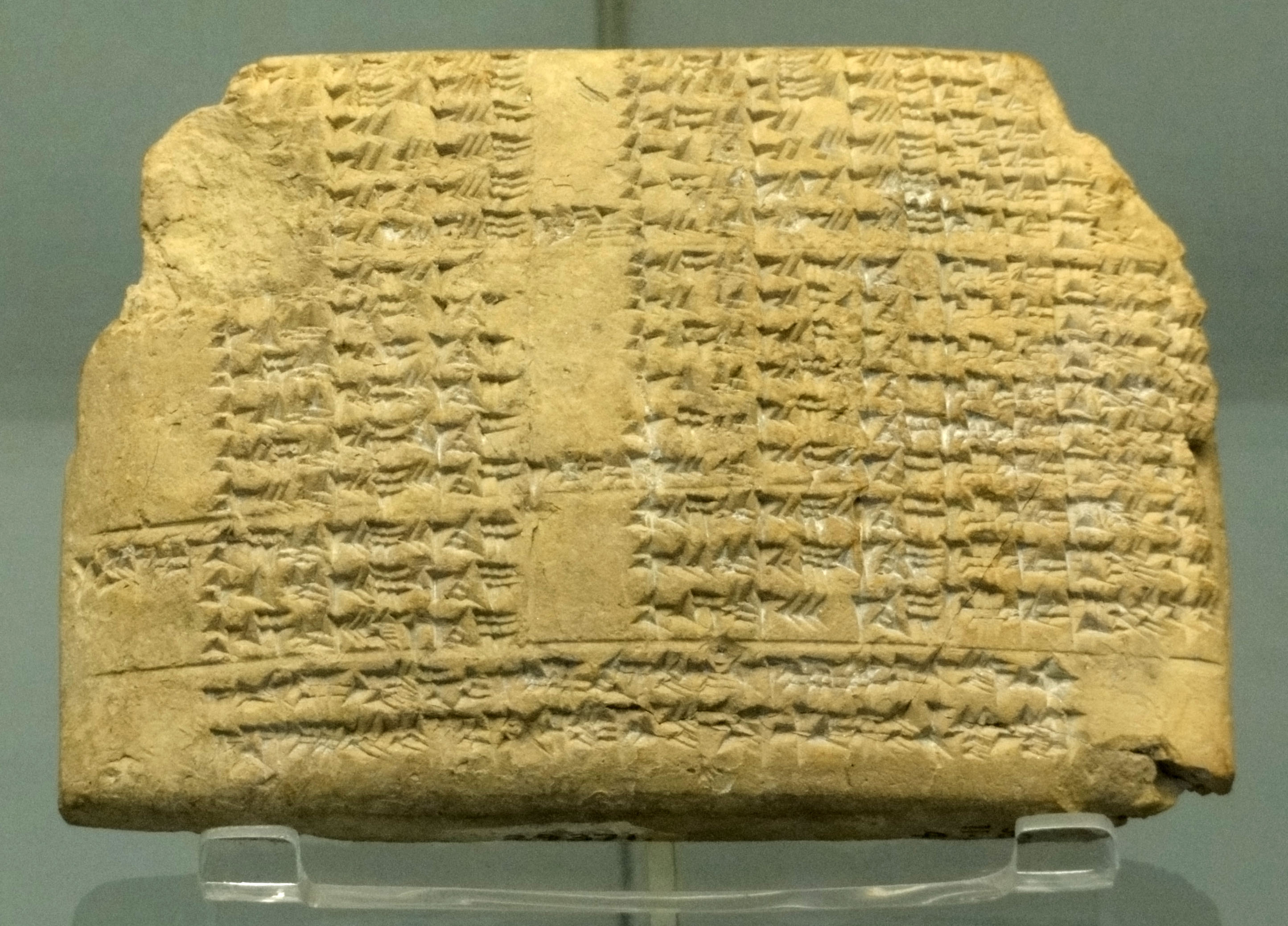
- Water clock calculations by Nabû-apla-iddina.
- Size: H:8.2 cm (3.2 in); W:11.8 cm (4.6 in); D:2.5 cm (0.98 in)
- Writing: cuneiform, Akkadian
- Created: 600BC-500BC
- Present location: Room 55, British Museum
- Identification: 29371

In Babylon, water clocks were of the outflow type and were cylindrical in shape. Use of the water clock as an aid to astronomical calculations dates back to the Old Babylonian Empire (c. 2000 – c. 1600 BC). While there are no surviving water clocks from the Mesopotamian region, most evidence of their existence comes from writings on clay tablets. Two collections of tablets, for example, are the Enuma Anu Enlil (1600–1200 BC) and the MUL.APIN (7th century BC). In these tablets, water clocks are used for payment of the night and day watches (guards).

These clocks were unique, as they did not have an indicator such as hands (as are typically used today) or grooved notches (as were used in Egypt). Instead, these clocks measured time "by the weight of water flowing from" it. The volume was measured in capacity units called qa. The weight, mana or mina (the Greek unit for about one pound), is the weight of water in a water clock.

In Babylonian times, time was measured with temporal hours. So, as seasons changed, so did the length of a day. "To define the length of a 'night watch' at the summer solstice, one had to pour two mana of water into a cylindrical clepsydra; its emptying indicated the end of the watch. One-sixth of mana had to be added each succeeding half-month. At the equinox, three mana had to be emptied in order to correspond to one watch, and four mana was emptied for each watch of the winter solstitial night."

=== Egypt ===
The oldest water clock of which there is physical evidence dates to c. 1417–1379 BC in the New Kingdom of Egypt, during the reign of the pharaoh Amenhotep III, where it was used in the Precinct of Amun-Re at Karnak. The oldest documentation of the water clock is the tomb inscription of the 16th century BC Egyptian court official Amenemhet, which identifies him as its inventor. These simple water clocks, which were of the outflow type, were stone vessels with sloping sides that allowed water to drip at a nearly constant rate from a small hole near the bottom. There were twelve separate columns with consistently spaced markings on the inside to measure the passage of "hours" as the water level reached them. The columns were for each of the twelve months to allow for the variations of the seasonal hours. Priests used these clocks to determine the time at night so that the temple rites and sacrifices could be performed at the correct hour.

=== India ===
N. Narahari Achar and Subhash Kak suggest that water clocks were used in ancient India as early as the 2nd millennium BC, based on their appearance in the Atharvaveda'. According to N. Kameswara Rao, pots excavated from the Indus Valley Civilisation site of Mohenjo-daro may have been used as water clocks. They are tapered at the bottom, have a hole on the side, and are similar to the utensil used to perform abhiṣeka (ritual water pouring) on lingams.

The Jyotisha, one of the six Vedanga disciplines, describes water clocks called ghati or kapala that measure time in units of nadika (around 24 minutes). A clepsydra in the form of a floating and sinking copper vessel is mentioned in the Sürya Siddhānta (5th century AD). At Nalanda mahavihara, an ancient Buddhist university, four-hour intervals were measured by a water clock, which consisted of a similar copper bowl holding two large floats in a larger bowl filled with water. The bowl was filled with water from a small hole at its bottom; it sank when filled and was marked by the beating of a drum in the daytime. The amount of water added varied with the seasons, and students at the university operated the clock.

Descriptions of similar water clocks are also given in the Pañca Siddhāntikā by the polymath Varāhamihira in the 6th century, which adds further detail to the account given in the Sūrya Siddhānta. Further descriptions are recorded in the Brāhmasphuṭasiddhānta by the mathematician Brahmagupta in the 7th century. A detailed description with measurements is also recorded by the astronomer Lalla in the 8th century, who describes the ghati as a hemispherical copper vessel with a hole that is fully filled after one nadika.

=== China ===
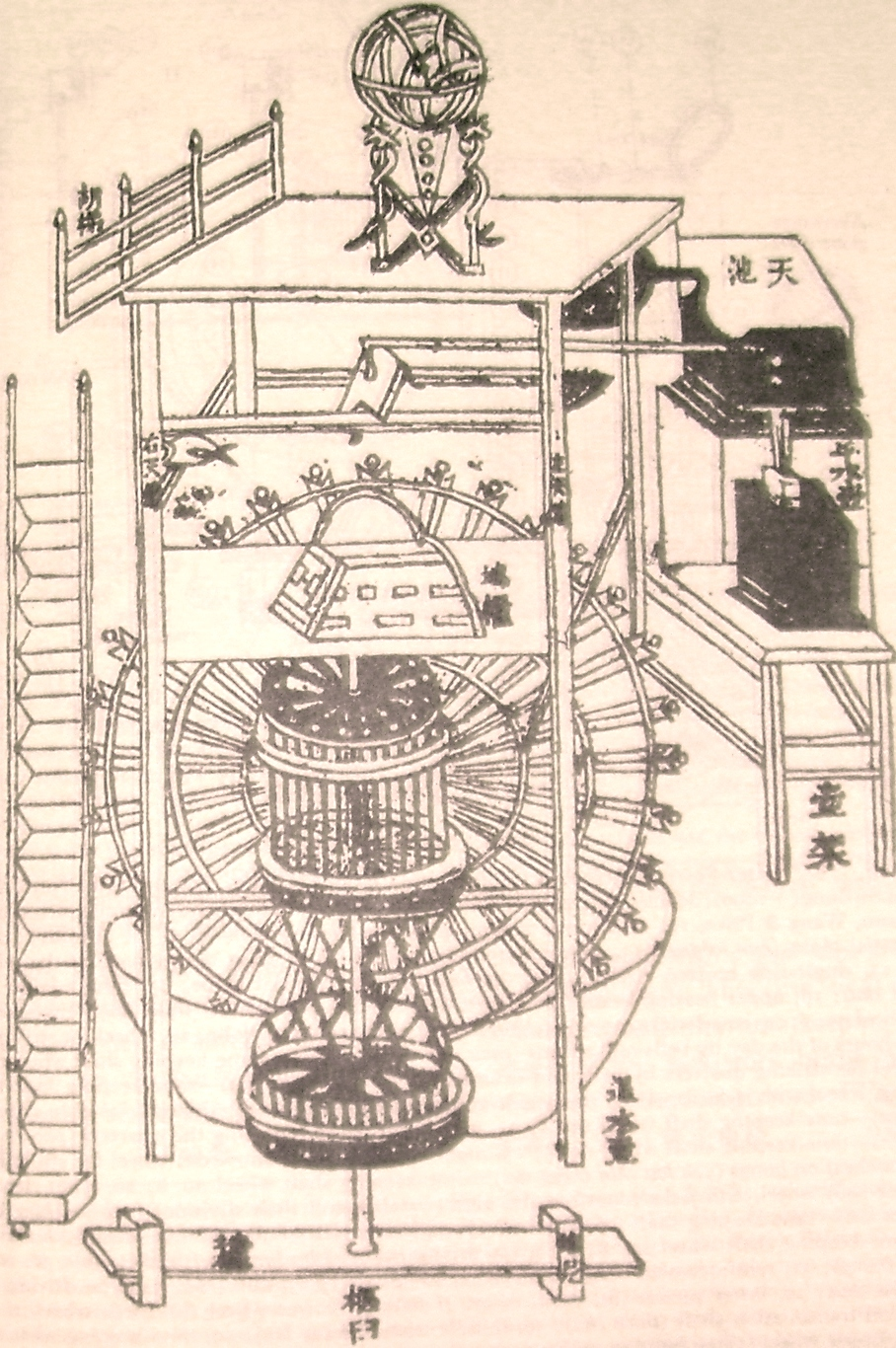
The water-powered mechanism of Su Song's astronomical clock tower, featuring a clepsydra tank, waterwheel, escapement mechanism, and chain drive to power an armillary sphere and 113 striking clock jacks to sound the hours and to display informative plaques

In ancient China, as well as throughout East Asia, water clocks were very important in the study of astronomy and astrology. The oldest written reference dates the use of the water clock in China to the 6th century BC. From about 200 BC onwards, the outflow clepsydra was replaced almost everywhere in China by the inflow type with an indicator-rod borne on a float(浮箭漏, fú jiàn lòu). The Han dynasty philosopher and politician Huan Tan (40 BC – AD 30), a Secretary at the Court in charge of clepsydrae, wrote that he had to compare clepsydrae with sundials because of how temperature and humidity affected their accuracy, demonstrating that the effects of evaporation, as well as of temperature on the speed at which water flows, were known at this time. The liquid in water clocks was liable to freezing, and had to be kept warm with torches, a problem that was solved in 976 by the Chinese astronomer and engineer Zhang Sixun. His invention—a considerable improvement on Yi Xing's clock—used mercury instead of water. Mercury is a liquid at room temperature, and freezes at −38.83 °C (−37.9 °F), lower than any air temperature common outside polar regions. Again, instead of using water, the early Ming Dynasty engineer Zhan Xiyuan (c. 1360–1380) created a sand-driven wheel clock, improved upon by Zhou Shuxue (c. 1530–1558).

The use of clepsydrae to drive mechanisms illustrating astronomical phenomena began with the Han Dynasty polymath Zhang Heng (78–139) in 117, who also employed a waterwheel. Zhang Heng was the first in China to add an extra compensating tank between the reservoir and the inflow vessel, which solved the problem of the falling pressure head in the reservoir tank. Zhang's ingenuity led to the creation by the Tang dynasty mathematician and engineer Yi Xing (683–727) and Liang Lingzan in 725 of a clock driven by a waterwheel linkwork escapement mechanism. The same mechanism would be used by the Song dynasty polymath Su Song (1020–1101) in 1088 to power his astronomical clock tower, as well as a chain drive. Su Song's clock tower, over 30 feet (9.1 m) tall, possessed a bronze power-driven armillary sphere for observations, an automatically rotating celestial globe, and five front panels with doors that permitted the viewing of changing mannequins which rang bells or gongs, and held tablets indicating the hour or other special times of the day. In the 2000s, in Beijing's Drum Tower an outflow clepsydra is operational and displayed for tourists. It is connected to automata so that every quarter-hour a small brass statue of a man claps his cymbals.

=== Persia ===
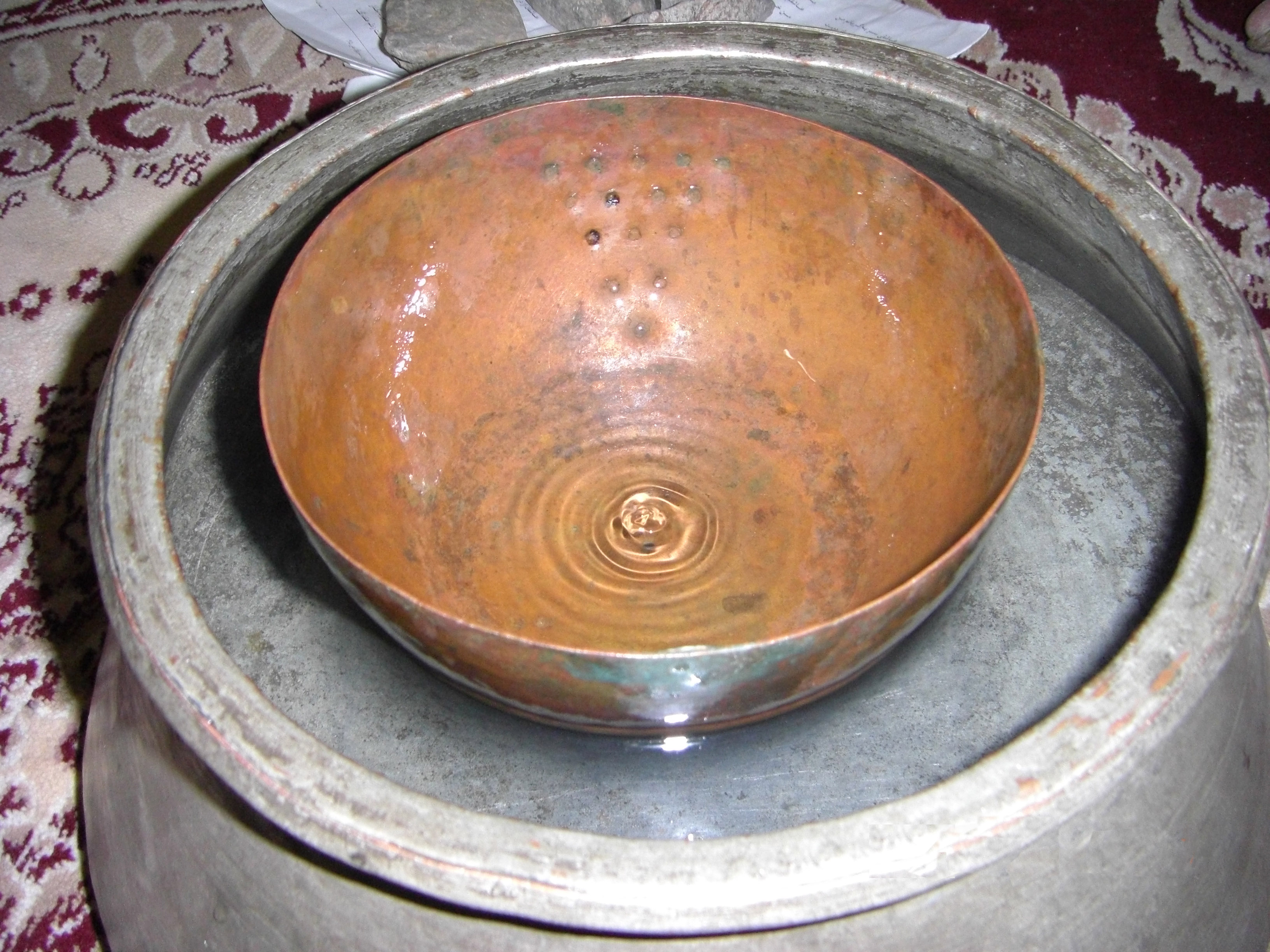
Ancient Persian clock

The use of water clocks in Greater Iran, especially in the desert areas such as Yazd, Isfahan, Zibad, and Gonabad, dates back to 500 BC. Later, they were also used to determine the exact holy days of pre-Islamic religions such as Nowruz (March equinox), Mehregan (September equinox), Tirgan (summer solstice) and Yaldā Night (winter solstice) – the shortest, longest, and equal-length days and nights of the years. The water clocks, called pengan (and later fenjan) used were one of the most practical ancient tools for timing the yearly calendar. The water clock was the most accurate and commonly used timekeeping device for calculating the amount or the time that a farmer must take water from a qanat or well for irrigation until more accurate current clocks replaced it.

Persian water clocks were a tool for the qanat's shareholders to calculate the length of time they could divert water to their farms or gardens. The qanat was the only water source for agriculture and irrigation in arid areas, so a just and fair water distribution was important. A person was elected to be the manager of the water clock or mir āb, and at least two full-time managers were needed to control and observe the number of hours and announce the exact time of the days and nights from sunrise to sunset because shareholders usually divided between day and night owners.

The Persian water clock consisted of a large pot full of water and a bowl with a small hole in the center. When the bowl became full of water, it would sink into the pot, and the manager would empty the bowl and again put it on the top of the water in the pot. He would record the number of times the bowl sank by putting small stones into a jar. The place where the clock was situated and its managers were collectively known as the khane pengān. Usually this would be the top floor of a public house, with west- and east-facing windows to show the time of sunset and sunrise. The Zibad water clock was in use until 1965, when it was replaced by modern clocks.

=== Greco-Roman world ===
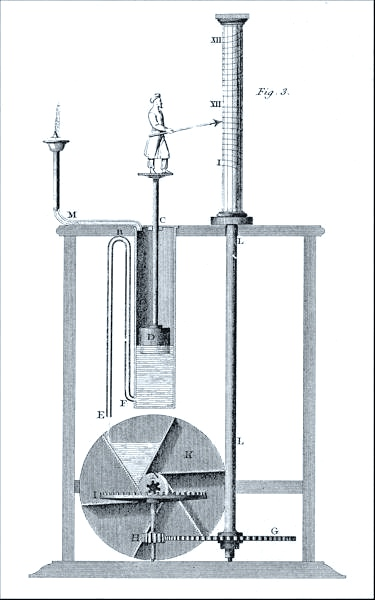
An early 19th-century illustration of Ctesibius's (285–222 BC) clepsydra from the 3rd century BC. The hour indicator ascends as water flows in. Also, a series of gears rotate a cylinder to correspond to the temporal hours.

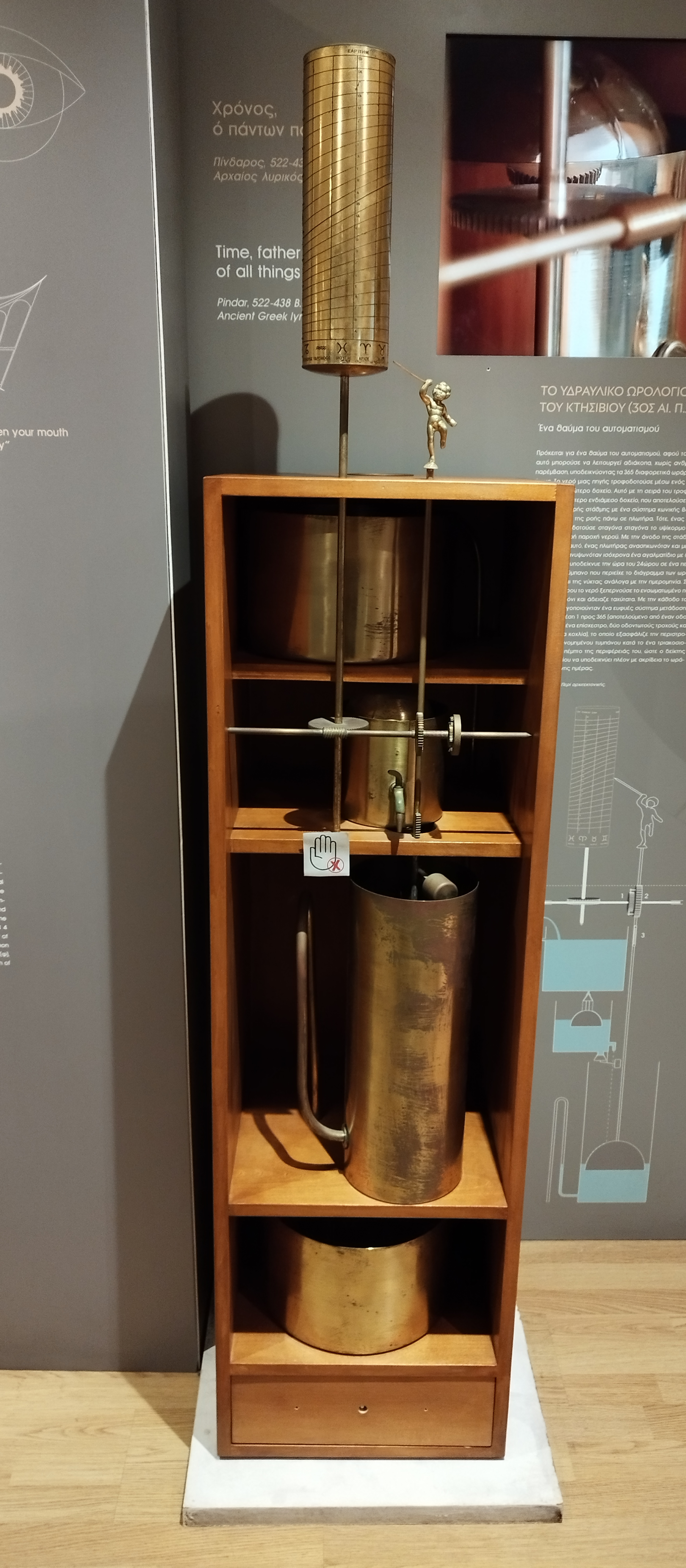
A modern reconstruction of Ctesibius' hydraulic clock (clepsydra), at the Kotsanas Museum of Ancient Greek Archaeology in Athens.

The word "clepsydra" comes from the Greek meaning "water thief". The Greeks considerably advanced the water clock by tackling the problem of the diminishing flow. They introduced several types of the inflow clepsydra, one of which included the earliest feedback control system. Ctesibius invented an indicator system typical for later clocks such as the dial and pointer. The Roman engineer Vitruvius described early alarm clocks, working with gongs or trumpets. A commonly used water clock was the simple outflow clepsydra. This small earthenware vessel had a hole in its side near the base. In both Greek and Roman times, this type of clepsydra was used in courts for allocating periods of time to speakers. In important cases, such as when a person's life was at stake, it was filled completely, but for more minor cases, only partially. If proceedings were interrupted for any reason, such as to examine documents, the hole in the clepsydra was stopped with wax until the speaker was able to resume his pleading.

==== Clepsydrae for keeping time ====
Some scholars suspect that the clepsydra may have been used as a stop-watch for imposing a time limit on clients' visits in Athenian brothels. Slightly later, in the early 3rd century BC, the Hellenistic physician Herophilos employed a portable clepsydra on his house visits in Alexandria for measuring his patients' pulse-beats. By comparing the rate by age group with empirically obtained data sets, he was able to determine the intensity of the disorder.

Between 270 BC and AD 500, Hellenistic (Ctesibius, Hero of Alexandria, Archimedes) and Roman horologists and astronomers were developing more elaborate mechanized water clocks. The added complexity was aimed at regulating the flow and at providing fancier displays of the passage of time. For example, some water clocks rang bells and gongs, while others opened doors and windows to show figurines of people, or moved pointers, and dials. Some even displayed astrological models of the universe. The 3rd century BC engineer Philo of Byzantium referred in his works to water clocks already fitted with an escapement mechanism, the earliest known of its kind.

The biggest achievement of the invention of clepsydrae during this time, however, was by Ctesibius with his incorporation of gears and a dial indicator to automatically show the time as the lengths of the days changed throughout the year, because of the temporal timekeeping used during his day. Also, a Greek astronomer, Andronicus of Cyrrhus, supervised the construction of his Horologion, known today as the Tower of the Winds, in the Athens marketplace (or agora) in the first half of the 1st century BC. This octagonal clocktower showed scholars and shoppers both sundials and a windvane. Inside it was a mechanized clepsydra, although the type of display it used cannot be known for sure; some possibilities are: a rod that moved up and down to display the time, a water-powered automaton that struck a bell to mark the hours, or a moving star disk in the ceiling.

=== Medieval Islamic world ===
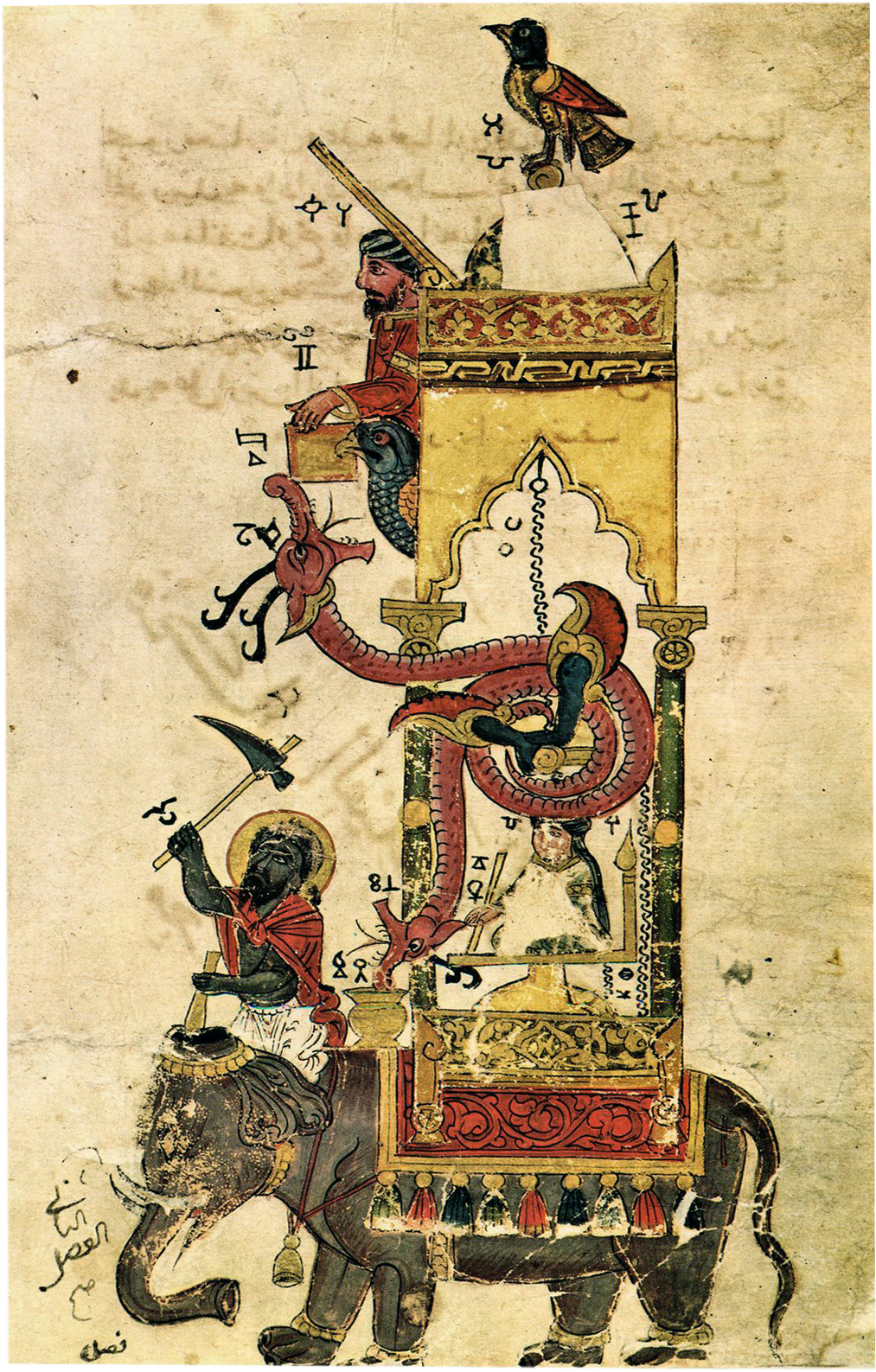
Al-Jazari's elephant water clock (1206).

In the medieval Islamic world (632-1280), the use of water clocks has its roots from Archimedes during the rise of Alexandria in Egypt and continues on through Byzantium. The water clocks by the Arabic engineer Al-Jazari, however, are credited for going "well beyond anything" that had preceded them. In Al-Jazari's 1206 treatise, he describes one of his water clocks, the elephant clock. The clock recorded the passage of temporal hours, which meant that the rate of flow had to be changed daily to match the uneven length of days throughout the year. To accomplish this, the clock had two tanks, the top tank was connected to the time indicating mechanisms and the bottom was connected to the flow control regulator. Basically, at daybreak, the tap was opened and water flowed from the top tank to the bottom tank via a float regulator that maintained a constant pressure in the receiving tank.

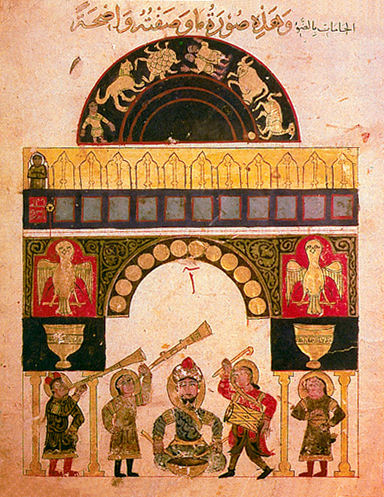
Water-powered automatic castle clock of Al-Jazari, 12th century.

The most sophisticated water-powered astronomical clock was Al-Jazari's castle clock, considered by some to be an early example of a programmable analog computer, in 1206. It was a complex device that was about 11 feet (3.4 m) high, and had multiple functions alongside timekeeping. It included a display of the zodiac and the solar and lunar orbits, and a pointer in the shape of the crescent moon which traveled across the top of a gateway, moved by a hidden cart and causing automatic doors to open, each revealing a mannequin, every hour. It was possible to re-program the length of day and night in order to account for the changing lengths of day and night throughout the year, and it also featured five musician automata who automatically play music when moved by levers operated by a hidden camshaft attached to a water wheel. Other components of the castle clock included a main reservoir with a float, a float chamber and flow regulator, plate and valve trough, two pulleys, crescent disc displaying the zodiac, and two falcon automata dropping balls into vases.

The first water clocks to employ complex segmental and epicyclic gearing was invented earlier by the Arab engineer Ibn Khalaf al-Muradi in Islamic Iberia c. 1000. His water clocks were driven by water wheels, as was also the case for several Chinese water clocks in the 11th century. Comparable water clocks were built in Damascus and Fez. The latter (Dar al-Magana) remains until today and its mechanism has been reconstructed. The first European clock to employ these complex gears was the astronomical clock created by Giovanni de Dondi in c. 1365. Like the Chinese, Arab engineers at the time also developed an escapement mechanism which they employed in some of their water clocks. The escapement mechanism was in the form of a constant-head system, while heavy floats were used as weights.

=== Korea ===
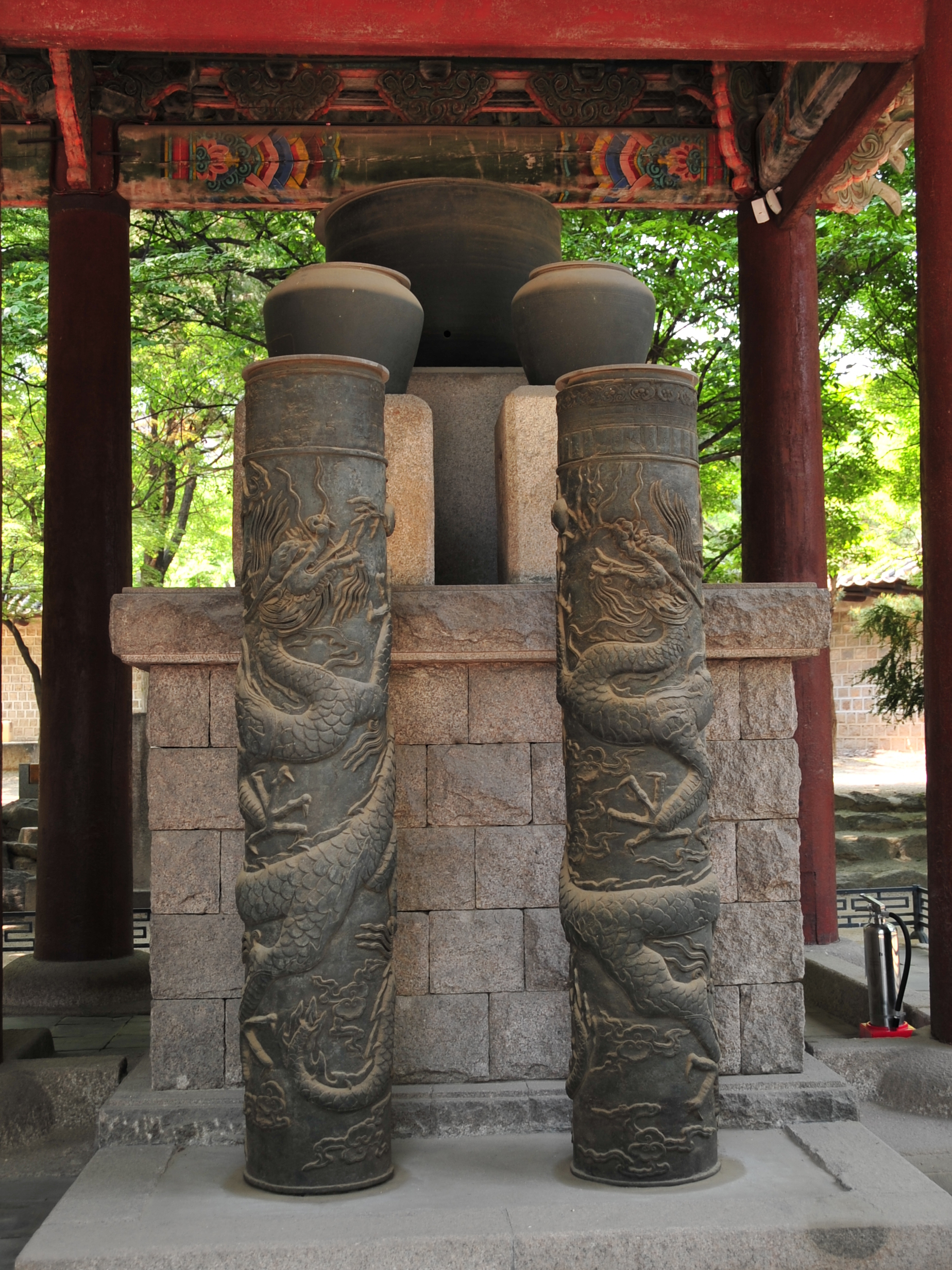
Chang Yŏngsil's self-striking water clock, the Borugak Jagyeongnu

In 718, Unified Silla established the system of clepsydra for the first time in Korean history, imitating the Tang Dynasty. In 1434, during Joseon rule, Chang Yŏngsil (Korean: 장영실; Hanja: 蔣英實), a palace guard and later chief court engineer, constructed the Borugak Jagyeongnu or self-striking water clock of Borugak Pavilion for Sejong the Great.

What made his water clock self-striking (or automatic) was using jack-work mechanisms: three wooden figures or "jacks" struck objects to signal the time. This innovation no longer required the reliance of human workers, known as "rooster men", to constantly replenish it.

The uniqueness of the clock was its capability to announce dual-times automatically with visual and audible signals. Chang developed a signal conversion technique that made it possible to measure analog time and announce digital time simultaneously as well as to separate the water mechanisms from the ball-operated striking mechanisms. The conversion device was called pangmok, and was placed above the inflow vessel that measured the time, the first device of its kind in the world. Thus, the Borugak water clock is the first hydro-mechanically engineered dual-time clock in the history of horology.

==== Japan ====
Emperor Tenji made Japan's first water clock called a Rokoku (漏刻). They were highly socially significant and run by Doctors of Water Clock

== Temperature, water viscosity, and clock accuracy ==
When viscosity can be neglected, the outflow rate of the water is governed by Torricelli's law, or more generally, by Bernoulli's principle. Viscosity will dominate the outflow rate if the water flows out through a nozzle that is sufficiently long and thin, as given by the Hagen–Poiseuille equation. Approximately, the flow rate is for such design inversely proportional to the viscosity, which depends on the temperature. Liquids generally become less viscous as the temperature increases. In the case of water, the viscosity varies by a factor of about seven between zero and 100 degrees Celsius. Thus, a water clock with such a nozzle would run about seven times faster at 100 °C than at 0 °C. Water is about 25 percent more viscous at 20 °C than at 30 °C, and a variation in temperature of one degree Celsius, in this "room temperature" range, produces a change of viscosity of about two percent. Therefore, a water clock with such a nozzle that keeps good time at some given temperature would gain or lose about half an hour per day if it were one degree Celsius warmer or cooler. To make it keep time within one minute per day would require its temperature to be controlled within 1/30°C (about 1/17°F). There is no evidence that this was done in antiquity, so ancient water clocks with sufficiently thin and long nozzles (unlike the modern pendulum-controlled one described above) cannot have been reliably accurate by modern standards. However, while modern timepieces may not be reset for long periods, water clocks were likely reset every day, when refilled, based on a sundial, so the cumulative error would not have been great.

== See also ==
- Bernard Gitton
- History of timekeeping devices
- Hourglass

== Notes ==
=== Sources used ===
- al-Hassan, Ahmad Y.; Hill, Donald R. (1986). Islamic Technology: An Illustrated History. Cambridge University Press. ISBN 0-521-26333-6. OCLC 13332728.
- Cotterell, Brian; Kamminga, Johan (1990). Mechanics of pre-industrial technology: An introduction to the mechanics of ancient and traditional material culture. Cambridge University Press. ISBN 0-521-42871-8. OCLC 18520966.
- Cowan, Harrison J. (1958). Time and Its Measurement: From the stone age to the nuclear age. Ohio: The World Publishing Company. Bibcode:1958tmfs.book.....C.
- Goodenow, Jennifer; Orr, Richard; Ross, David (2007), Mathematical Models of Water Clocks (PDF), Rochester Institute of Technology
- Hill, D.R. (1981). Arabic Water–Clocks. Syria: University of Aleppo.
- Lewis, Michael (2000). "Theoretical Hydraulics, Automata, and Water Clocks". In Wikander, Örjan (ed.). Handbook of Ancient Water Technology. Technology and Change in History. Vol. 2. Leiden. pp. 343–369 (356f.). ISBN 90-04-11123-9.
- Needham, Joseph (1986). Science & Civilization in China: Volume 4, Physics and Physical Technology, Part 2, Mechanical Engineering. Taipei: Caves Books.
- Needham, Joseph (1995). Science & Civilisation in China: Volume 3, Mathematics and the Sciences of the Heavens and the Earth. Cambridge University Press. ISBN 0-521-05801-5. OCLC 153247126.
- Needham, Joseph (2000). Science & Civilisation in China: Volume 4, Physics and Physical Technology, Part 2, Mechanical Engineering. Cambridge University Press. ISBN 0-521-05803-1. OCLC 153247141.
- Neugebauer, Otto (1947). "Studies in Ancient Astronomy. VIII. The Water Clock in Babylonian Astronomy". Isis. 37 (1/2): 37–43. doi:10.1086/347965. PMID 20247883. S2CID 120229480. (Reprinted in Neugebauer, Otto (1983). Astronomy and History: Selected Essays. pp. 239–245.)
- Temple, Robert (1986). The Genius of China: 3000 years of science, discovery and invention. New York: Simon and Schuster. p. 55. ISBN 9780671620288.
- Turner, Anthony J. (1984). The Time Museum. Vol. I: Time Measuring Instruments, Part 3: Water-clocks, Sand-glasses, Fire-clocks. Rockford, IL: The Museum. ISBN 0-912947-01-2. OCLC 159866762.
