= Al-Muradi =

al-Muradi may refer to:

- Abu Jafar al-Muradi, a 10th-century Egyptian grammarian
- Ibn Khalaf al-Muradi, an 11th-century Andalusian engineer
- Khalil al-Muradi, an 18th-century Syrian historian
- Muhammad Bey al-Muradi, a 17th-century Tunisian bey
