= Borugak Jagyeongnu =

15th-century Korean water clock

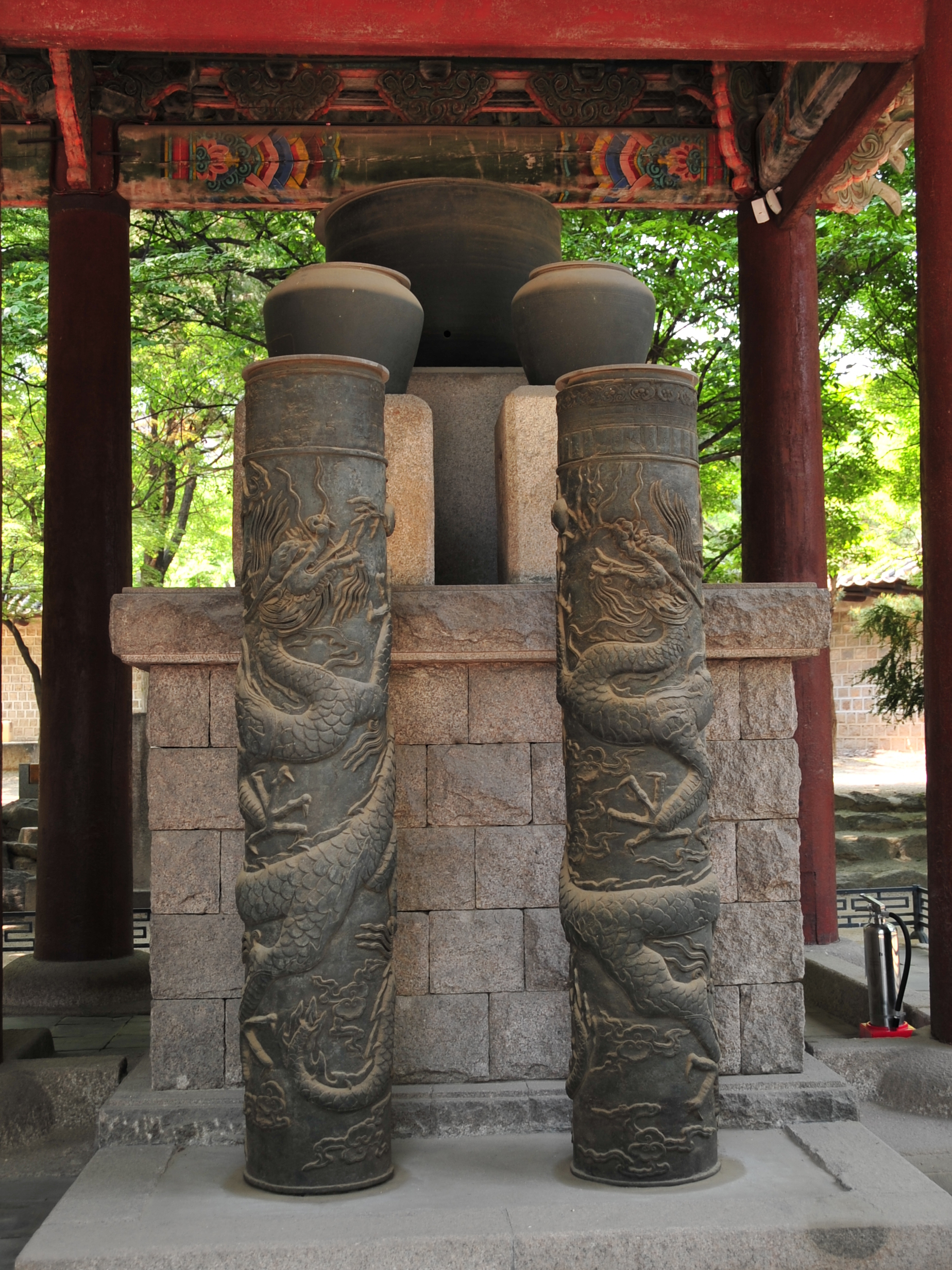

Korean name
- Hangul: 보루각자격루
- Hanja: 報漏閣自擊漏
- Revised Romanization: Borugak jagyeongnu
- McCune–Reischauer: Porugak chagyŏngnu

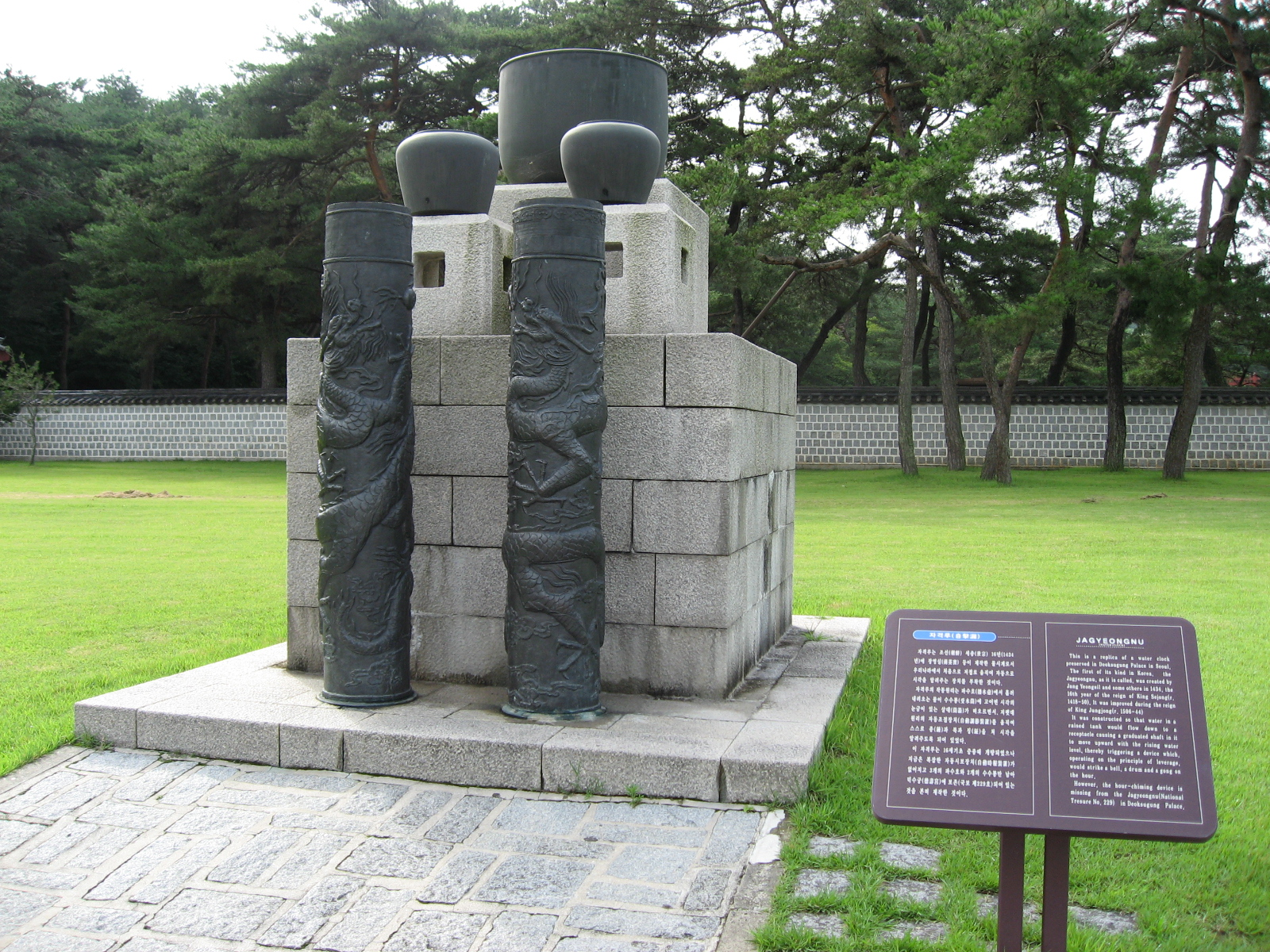
A model of the water clock

The Borugak Jagyeongnu ("Water Clock of Borugak Pavilion"), classified as a scientific instrument, is the 229th National Treasure of South Korea and was designated by the South Korean government on March 3, 1985. The water clock is currently held and managed by the National Palace Museum of Korea in Seoul. It dates to the time of King Sejong of the Joseon Dynasty.

Water clocks have a long history of use in Korea with the first mention of one in the records of the Samguk Sagi during the Three Kingdoms era. In 1434, during the reign of King Sejong the Great a water clock was made by Chang Yŏngsil which would mark the hour automatically with the sounds of a bell, gong, and drum. That clock, Jagyeokru ("self-striking water clock"), was used to keep the standard of time in the Joseon Dynasty. The clock was not preserved well and so in 1536, King Jungjong ordered the clock remade and improved which was done by Yu Jeon. Today, only three water bowls and two cylindrical water containers survive from the 1434 version of the clock, and no records mentioning its existence. Extensive records of 1536 version remain, and it is believed that the two clocks were very similar. In its current configuration the large bronze cylindrical water containers are 93.5 centimeters in diameter and 70 centimeters in height. The smaller ceramic vessels are 46.0 centimeters and 40.5 centimeters in height. The two bases for the ceramic vessels still survived in the Myeongjeonjeon Hall of Changgyeonggung Palace. A third version of the clock was built in 2007.

The water clock worked by having water poured into the largest bronze vessel which flowed into the smaller vessels which then flowed into the long water tanks. When the water level rose to the appropriate level, a floating rod touched a lever device which caused a ball to roll and hit another ball at the other end. The rolling ball would trigger the gong, bell, drum, and even a wooden puppet which marked the hour with a placard.

The clepsydra does not work today because only the water holding vessels have survived. However, it is valuable because of the scientific and cultural information it holds and because there are only few examples of ancient automatic water clocks. It is the oldest and largest surviving clock of its kind.

== See also ==
- Chang Yŏngsil
- Water clock
- National treasures of South Korea
- National treasures of North Korea
