= Su Song =

Polymath (1020–1101)

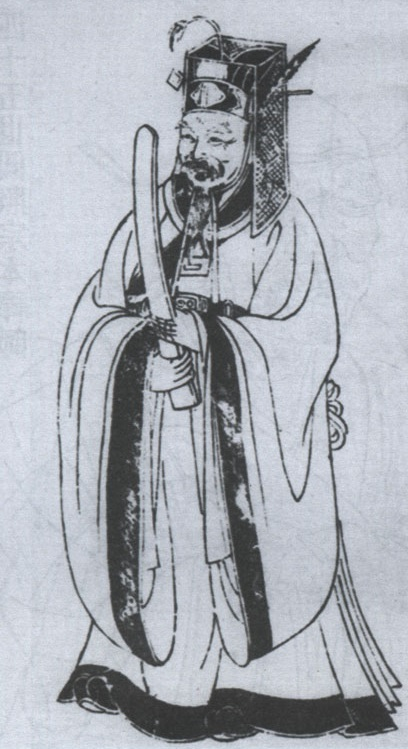
- Born: 1020 near Quanzhou city
- Died: 1101 (aged 80–81)
- Occupations: Scholar-bureaucrat, Scientist, statesmen

Su Song
- Chinese: 蘇頌
Transcriptions
Standard Mandarin
- Hanyu Pinyin: Sū Sòng
- Wade–Giles: Su^{1}Sung^{4}
Yue: Cantonese
- Jyutping: Sou1 Zung6

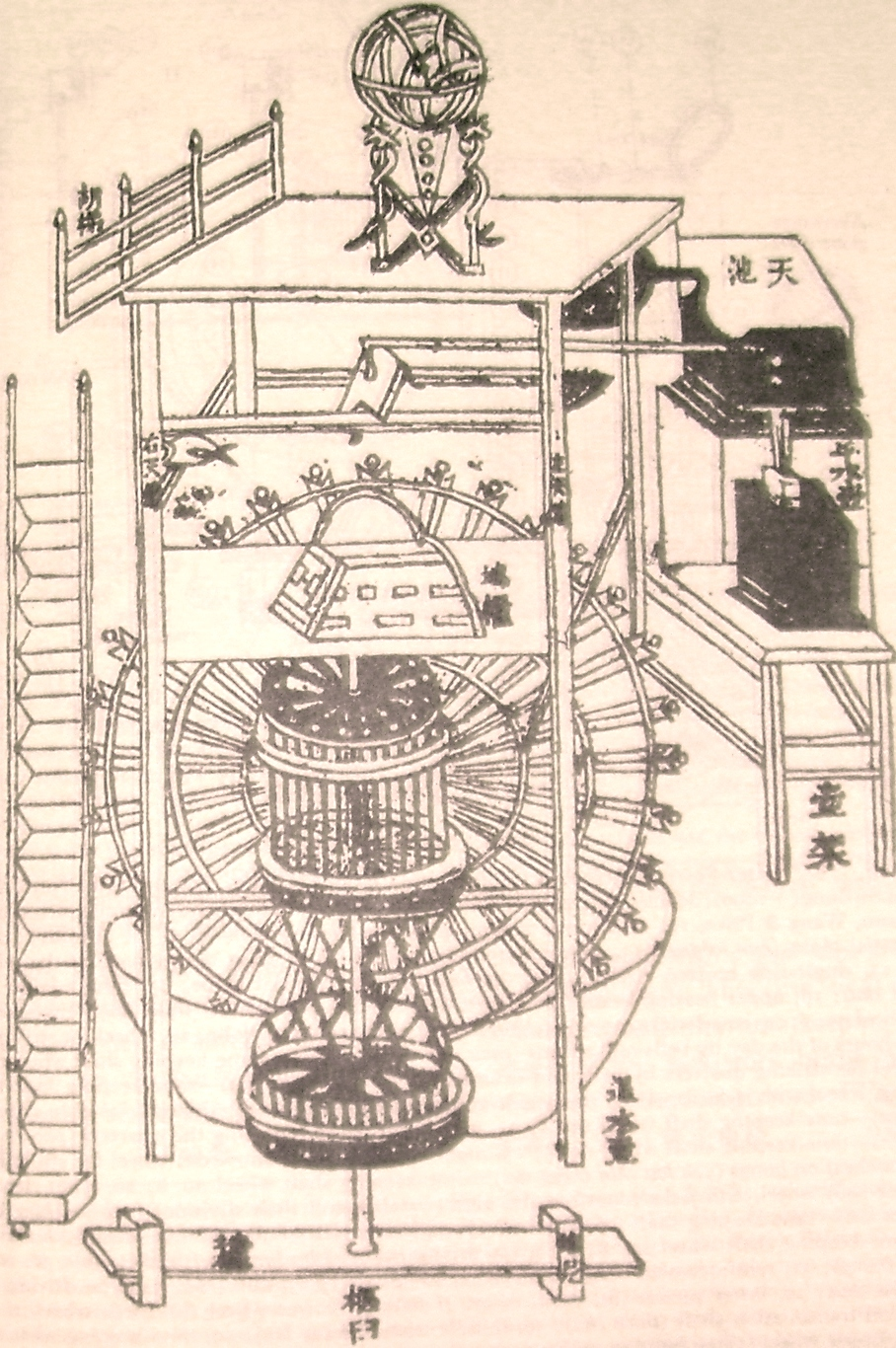
The original diagram of Su's book showing the inner workings of his clocktower

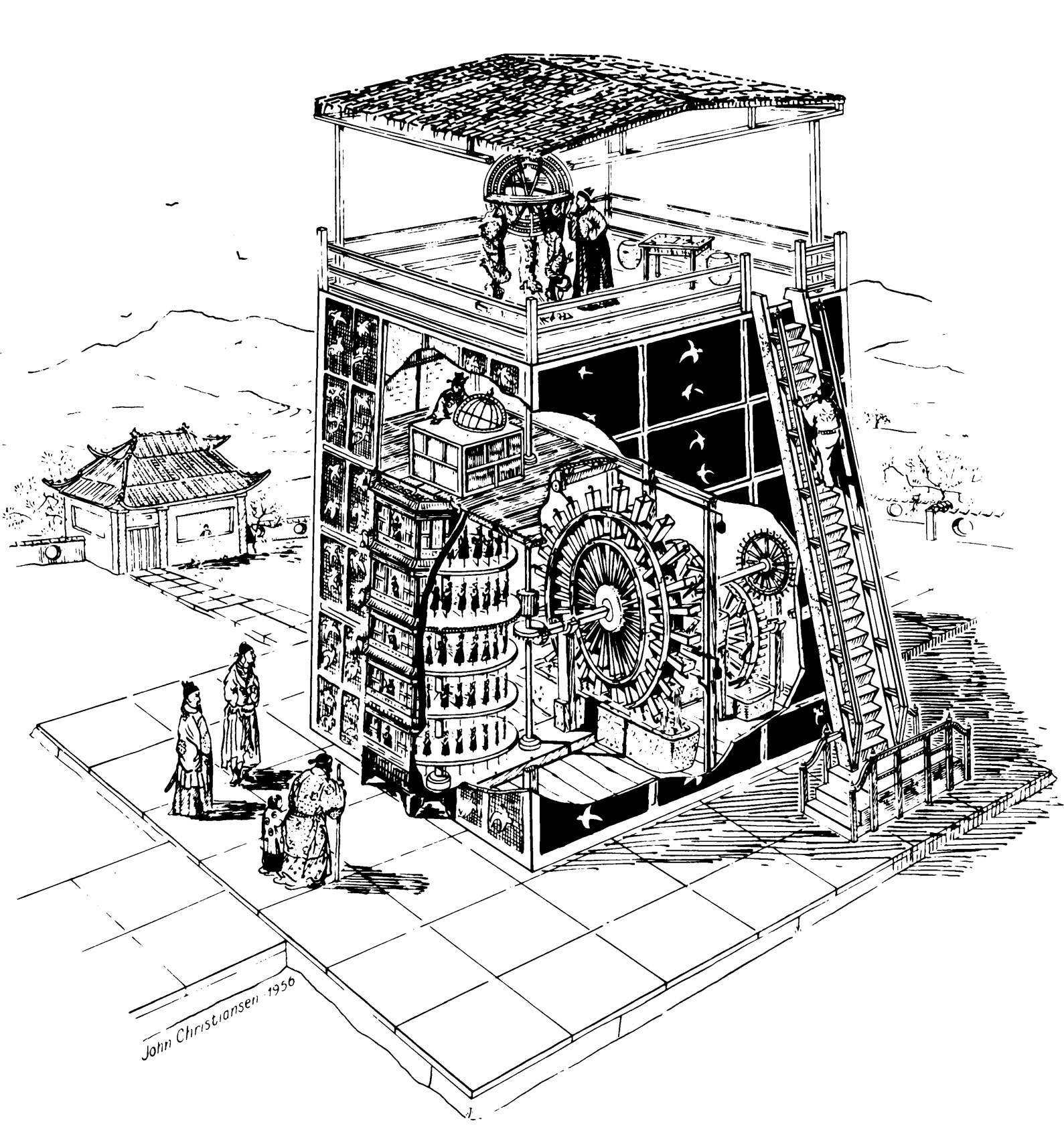
Illustration of the inner workings of the Astronomical Clock Tower

Su Song (Chinese: 蘇頌; Pe̍h-ōe-jī: So͘ Siōng, Hanyu Pinyin: Sū Sòng, 1020–1101), courtesy name Zirong (Chinese: 子容; Pe̍h-ōe-jī: Chú-iông), was a Chinese polymathic scientist and statesman who lived during the Song dynasty (960–1279). He excelled in numerous fields including but not limited to mathematics, astronomy, cartography, geography, metallurgy, mechanical engineering, hydraulic engineering, poetry, and statesmanship.

Su Song was the engineer for a hydro-mechanical astronomical clock tower located in Kaifeng. It employed an early escapement mechanism. The escapement mechanism of Su's clock tower was invented by the Tang dynasty Buddhist monk Yi Xing and government official Liang Lingzan in 725 AD to operate a water-powered armillary sphere, however Su's armillary sphere was the first to utilize a mechanical clock drive. Su's clock tower also featured the oldest known endless power-transmitting chain drive, called the tian ti (天梯), or "celestial ladder", as depicted in his horological treatise. The clock tower had 133 different clock jacks to indicate and sound the hours. The clock was dismantled and moved north to Beijing in 1127 AD, and although attempts were made to reassemble it, the tower was never successfully reinstated.

Su Song's treatise about the clock tower, Xinyi Xiangfayao (新儀象法要), was written in 1092 and received its official printed publication in 1094. The Xinyi Xiangfayao was Su's best-known treatise, but the polymath compiled other works as well. He completed a large celestial atlas of several star maps, several terrestrial maps, as well as a treatise on pharmacology. The latter discussed related subjects on mineralogy, zoology, botany, and metallurgy.

== Life and works ==
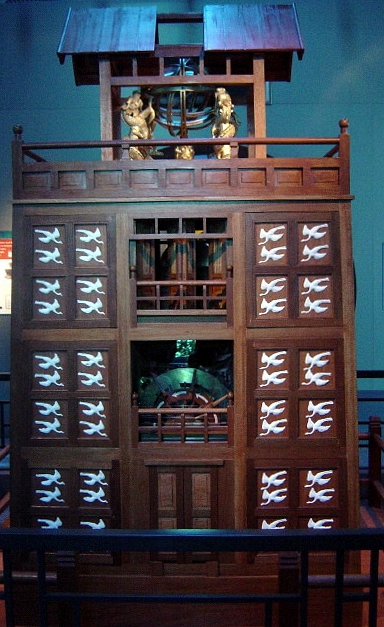
A scale model of Su Song's Astronomical Clock Tower

=== Career as a scholar-official ===
Su Song was of Hokkien ancestry who was born in modern-day Fujian, near medieval Quanzhou. Like his contemporary, Shen Kuo (1031–1095), Su Song was a polymath, a person whose expertise spans a significant number of different fields of study. It was written by his junior colleague and Hanlin scholar Ye Mengde (1077–1148) that in Su's youth, he mastered the provincial exams and rose to the top of the examination list for writing the best article on general principles and structure of the Chinese calendar. From an early age, his interests in astronomy and calendrical science led him onto a distinguished path as a state bureaucrat. In his spare time, he was fond of writing poetry, which he used to praise the works of artists such as the painter Li Gonglin (1049–1106). He was also an antiquarian and collector of old artworks from previous dynasties.

In matters of administrative government, he had attained the rank of Ambassador and President of the Ministry of Personnel at the capital of Kaifeng, and was known also as an expert in administration and finance. After serving in the Ministry of Personnel, he became a Minister of Justice in 1086. He was appointed as a distinguished editor for the Academy of Scholarly Worthies, where in 1063 he edited, redacted, commented on, and added a preface for the classic work Huainanzi of the Han dynasty (202 BC–220 AD). Eventually, Su rose to the post of Vice President of the Chancellery Secretariat. Among many honorable positions and titles conferred upon him, Su Song was also one of the 'Deputy Tutors of the Heir Apparent'. At court, he chose to distance himself from the political rivalries of the Conservatives, led by Prime Minister Sima Guang (1019–1086), and the Reformists, led by Prime Minister Wang Anshi (1021–1086); although many of his associates were of the Conservative faction.

In 1077, he was dispatched on a diplomatic mission to the Liao dynasty of the Khitan people to the north, sharing ideas about calendrical science, as the Liao state had created its own calendar in 994 AD. In a finding that reportedly embarrassed the court, Su Song acknowledged to the emperor that the calendar of the Khitan people was in fact a bit more accurate than their own, resulting in the fining and punishment of officials in the Bureau of Astronomy and Calendar. Su was supposed to travel north to Liao and arrive promptly for a birthday celebration and feast on a day which coincided with the winter solstice of the Song calendar, but was actually a day behind the Liao calendar. Historian Liu Heping states that Emperor Zhezong of Song sponsored Su Song's clocktower in 1086 in order to compete with the Liao for "scientific and national superiority." In 1081, the court instructed Su Song to compile into a book the diplomatic history of Song-Liao relations, an elaborate task that, once complete, filled 200 volumes. With his extensive knowledge of cartography, Su Song was able to settle a heated border dispute between the Song and Liao dynasties.

=== Astronomy ===
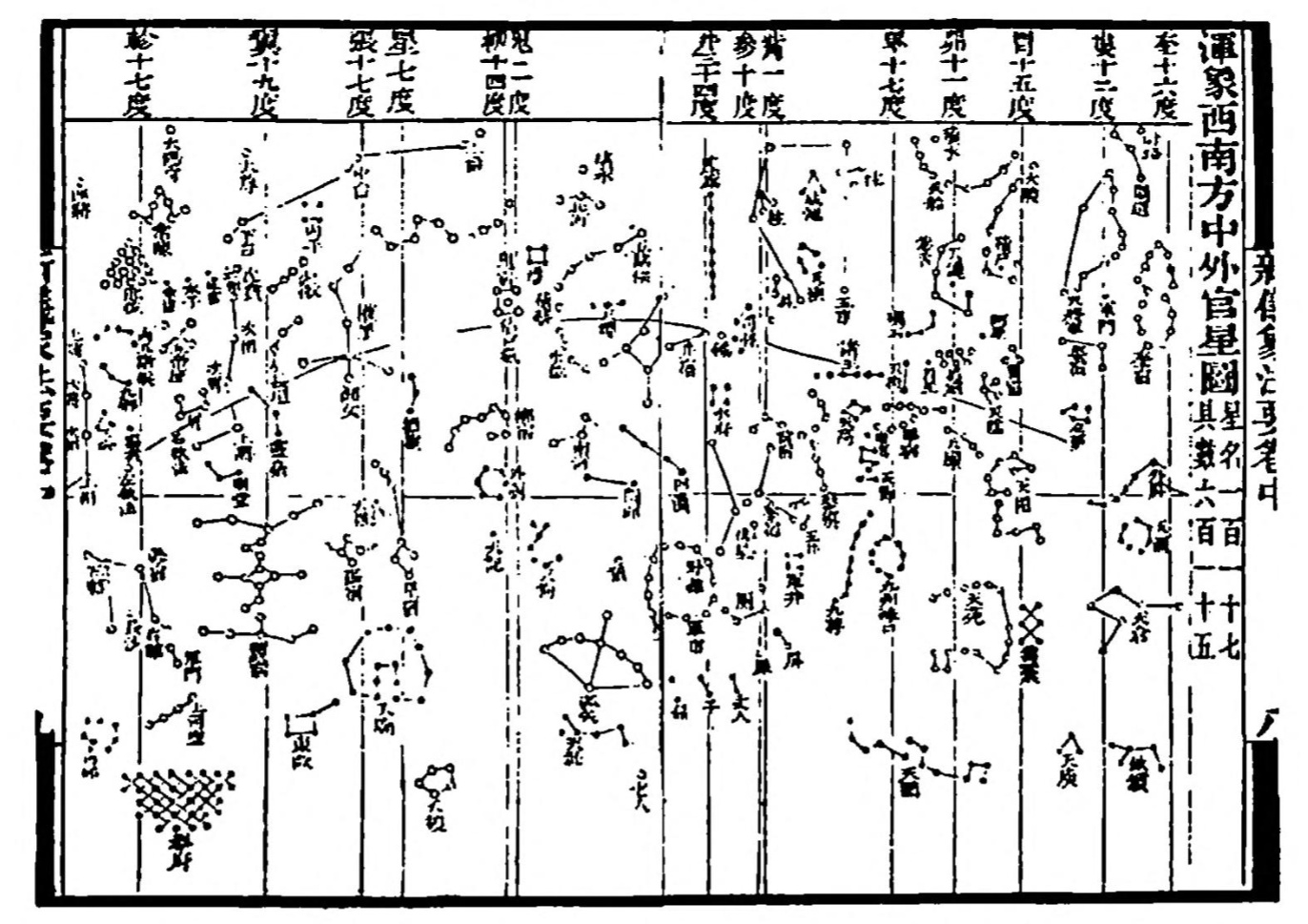
A star map with equidistant cylindrical projection, from Su Song's Xinyi Xiangfayao, 1092

Su Song also created a celestial atlas (in five separate maps), which had the hour circles between the xiu (lunar mansions) forming the astronomical meridians, with stars marked in an equidistant cylindrical projection on each side of the equator, and thus, was in accordance to their north polar distances. Furthermore, Su Song must have taken advantage of the astronomical findings of his political rival and contemporary astronomer Shen Kuo. Su Song's fourth star map places the position of the pole star halfway between Tian shu (−350 degrees) and the current Polaris; this was the more accurate calculation (by 3 degrees) that Shen Kuo had made when he observed the pole star over a period of three months with his width-improved sighting tube. There were many star maps written before Song's book, but the star maps published by Su represent the oldest extant star maps in printed form.

=== Pharmacology, botany, zoology, and mineralogy ===
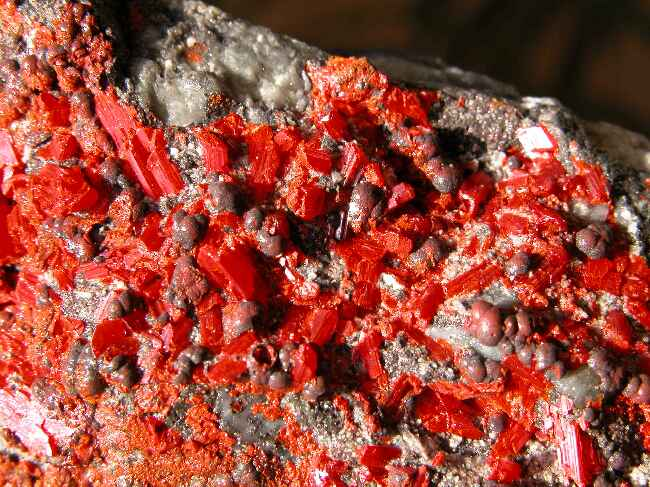
Su categorized and accurately described the attributes of many minerals, including the red, pitted surface of realgar seen above.

In 1070, Su Song and a team of scholars compiled and edited the Bencao Tujing ('Illustrated Pharmacopoeia', original source material from 1058 to 1061), which was a groundbreaking treatise on pharmaceutical botany, zoology, and mineralogy. In compiling information for pharmaceutical knowledge, Su Song worked with such notable scholars as Zhang Yuxi, Lin Yi, Zhang Dong, and many others.

This treatise documented a wide range of pharmaceutical practices, including the use of ephedrine as a drug. It includes valuable information on metallurgy and the steel and iron industries during 11th century China. He created a systematic approach to listing various different minerals and their use in medicinal concoctions, such as all the variously known forms of mica that could be used to cure ills through digestion. He wrote of the subconchoidal fracture of native cinnabar, signs of ore beds, and provided description on crystal form. Similar to the ore channels formed by circulation of ground water written of by the later German scientist Georgius Agricola, Su Song made similar statements concerning copper carbonate, as did the earlier Rihua Bencao of 970 with copper sulphate. Su's book was also the first pharmaceutical treatise written in China to describe the flax, Urtica thunbergiana, and Corchoropsis tomentosa (crenata) plants. According to Edward H. Schafer, Su accurately described the translucent quality of fine realgar, its origin from pods found in rocky river gorges, its matrix being pitted with holes and having a deep red, almost purple color, and that the mineral varied in sizes ranging from the size of a pea to a walnut.

Citing evidence from an ancient work by Zheng Xuan (127–200), Su believed that physicians of the ancient Zhou dynasty (1046–256 BC) used realgar as a remedy for ulcers. As believed in Su's day, the "five poisons" used by Zhou era physicians for this purpose were thought to be cinnabar, realgar, chalcanthite, alum, and magnetite. Su made systematic descriptions of animals and the environmental regions they could be found, such as different species of freshwater, marine, and shore crabs. For example, he noted that the freshwater crab species Eriocher sinensis could be found in the Huai River running through Anhui, in waterways near the capital city, as well as reservoirs and marshes of Hebei. Su's book was preserved and copied into the Bencao Gangmu of the Ming dynasty (1368–1644) physician and pharmacologist Li Shizhen (1518–1593).

=== Horology and mechanical engineering ===
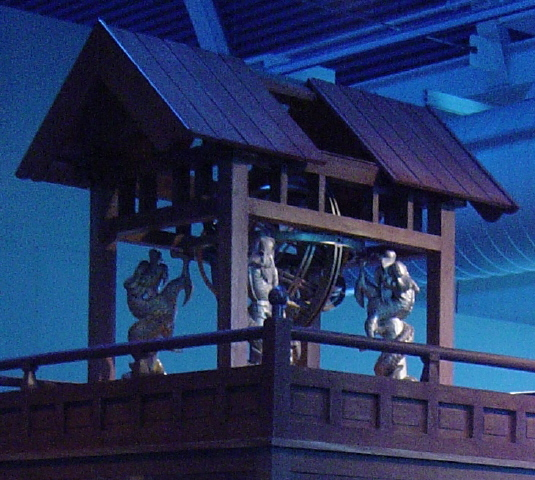
Armillary sphere on roof

Su Song compiled one of the greatest Chinese horological treatises of the Middle Ages, surrounding himself with an entourage of notable engineers and astronomers to assist in various projects. Xinyi Xiangfayao (lit. "Essentials of a New Method for Mechanizing the Rotation of an Armillary Sphere and a Celestial Globe"), written in 1092, was the final product of his life's achievements in horology and clockwork. The book included 47 different illustrations of great detail of the mechanical workings for his astronomical clock tower.

Su Song's greatest project was the 40-foot-tall water-powered astronomical clock tower constructed in Kaifeng, the wooden pilot model completed in 1088, the bronze components cast by 1090, while the wholly finished work was completed by 1094 during the reign of Emperor Zhezong of Song. The emperor had previously commissioned Han Gonglian, Acting Secretary of the Ministry of Personnel, to head the project, but the leadership position was instead handed down to Su Song. The emperor ordered in 1086 for Su to reconstruct the hun yi, or "armillary clock", for a new clock tower in the capital city. Su worked with the aid of Han Gong-lian, who applied his extensive knowledge of mathematics to the construction of the clock tower. A small-scale wooden model was first crafted by Su Song, testing its intricate parts before applying it to an actual full-scale clock tower. In the end, the clock tower had many impressive features, such as the hydro-mechanical, rotating armillary sphere crowning the top level and weighing some 10 to 20 tons, a bronze celestial globe located in the middle that was 4.5 feet in diameter, mechanically timed and rotating mannequins dressed in miniature Chinese clothes that exited miniature opening doors to announce the time of day by presenting designated reading plaques, ringing bells and gongs, or beating drums, a sophisticated use of oblique gears and an escapement mechanism, as well as an exterior facade of a fanciful Chinese pagoda. Upon its completion, the tower was called the Shui Yun Yi Xiang Tai, or "Tower for the Water-Powered Sphere and Globe". Joseph Needham writes:

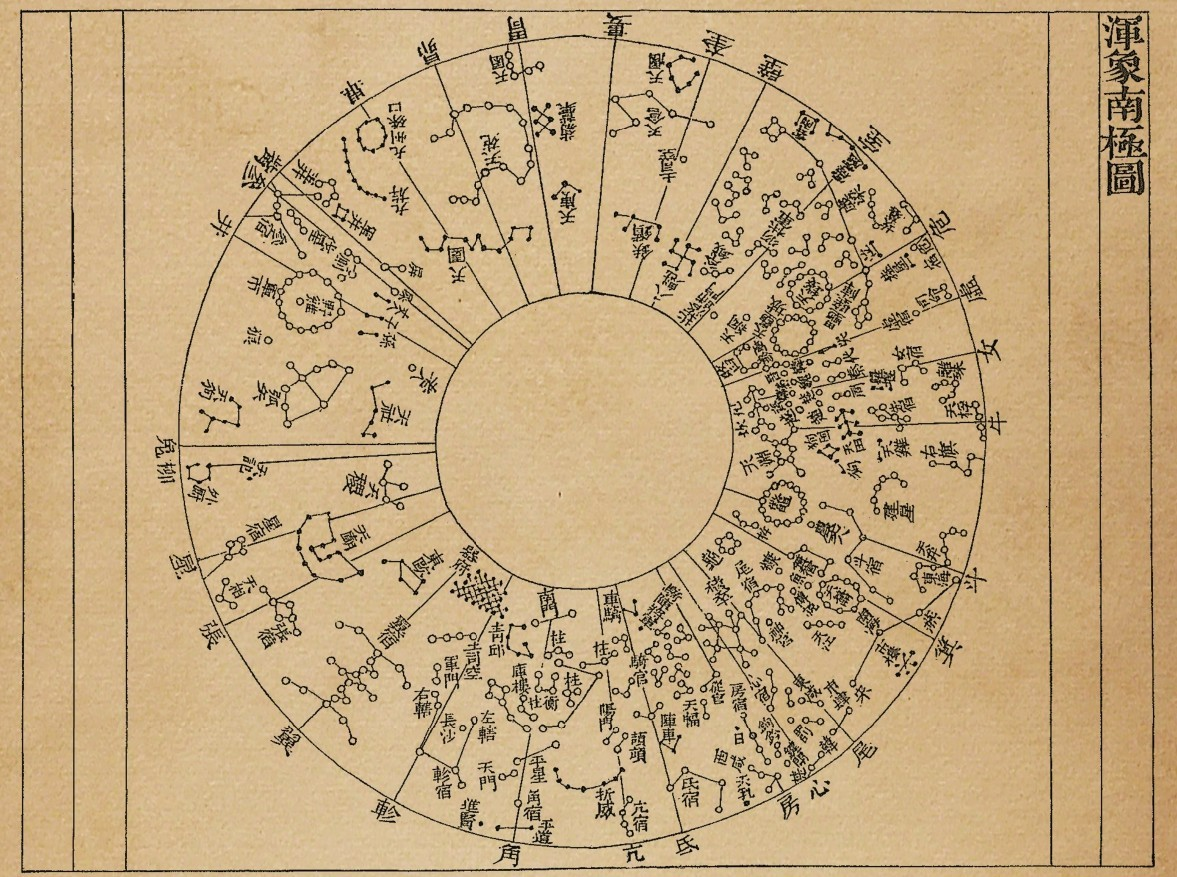
Star map of the south polar projection for Su's celestial globe, Xinyi Xiangfayao, 1092

After the invention of the escapement in [AD] 725 [during the Tang dynasty], there was a great flourishing of gear-wheels in clockwork and jackwork, culminating in the bronze and iron of Su Sung's elaborate masterpiece in [AD] 1088.

The clock tower was later dismantled piece by piece and brought south after the imperial capital moved southeast from Kaifeng city. However, due to the complexity of the tower, they were unable to piece it back together. The new Emperor Gaozong of Song instructed Su's son, Su Xie, to construct a new astronomical clock tower in its place, and Su Xie set to work studying his father's texts with a team of other experts. However, they were also unsuccessful in creating another clock tower, and Su Xie was convinced that Su Song had purposefully left out essential components in his written work and diagrams so that others would not steal his ideas.

As the sinologist historian Derk Bodde points out, Su Song's astronomical clock did not lead to a new generation of mass-produced clockworks throughout China since his work was largely a government-sponsored endeavor for the use of astronomers and astrologers in the imperial court. Yet the mechanical legacy of Su Song did not end with his work. In about 1150, the writer Xue Jixuan noted that there were four types of clocks in his day, the basic waterclock, the incense clock, the sundial, and the clock with 'revolving and snapping springs' ('gun tan'). The rulers of the continuing Yuan dynasty (1279–1368 AD) had a vested interest in the advancement of mechanical clockworks. The astronomer Guo Shoujing helped restore the Beijing Ancient Observatory beginning in 1276, where he crafted a water-powered armillary sphere and clock with clock jacks being fully implemented and sounding the hours. Complex gearing for uniquely Chinese clockworks were continued in the Ming dynasty (1368–1644), with new designs driven by the power of falling sand instead of water to provide motive power to the wheel drive, and some Ming clocks perhaps featured reduction gearing rather than the earlier escapement of Su Song. The earliest such design of a sand-clock was made by Zhan Xiyuan around 1370, which featured not only the scoop wheel of Su Song' device, but also a new addition of a stationary dial face over which a pointer circulated, much like new European clocks of the same period.

== Su Song's escapement mechanism ==
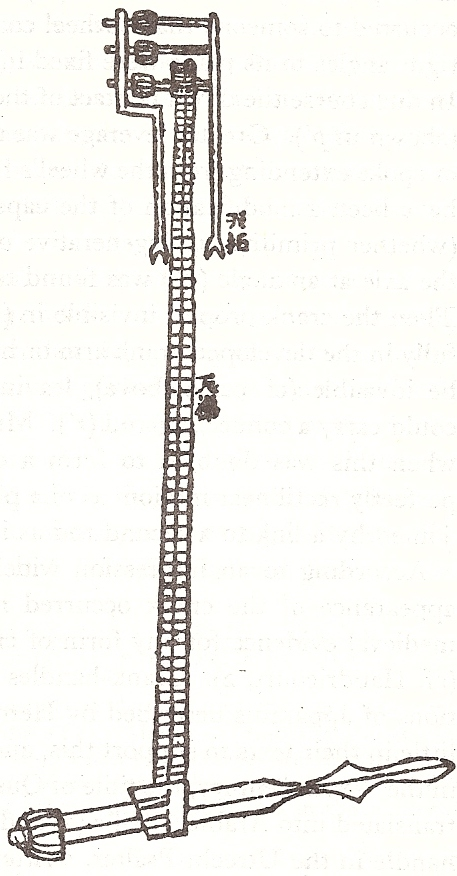
The oldest known illustration of an endless power-transmitting chain drive, from Su's book of 1092; it was called the "celestial ladder" and was used for coupling the main driving shaft of his clock tower to the armillary sphere gear box (which was mounted at the top of the tower).

In Su Song's waterwheel linkwork device, the action of the escapement's arrest and release was achieved by gravity exerted periodically as the continuous flow of liquid filled containers of a limited size. In a single line of evolution, Su Song's clock therefore united the concept of the clepsydra and the mechanical clock into one device run by mechanics and hydraulics. In his memorial, Su Song wrote about this concept:

According to your servant's opinion there have been many systems and designs for astronomical instruments during past dynasties all differing from one another in minor respects. But the principle of the use of water-power for the driving mechanism has always been the same. The heavens move without ceasing but so also does water flow (and fall). Thus if the water is made to pour with perfect evenness, then the comparison of the rotary movements (of the heavens and the machine) will show no discrepancy or contradiction; for the unresting follows the unceasing.

In his writing, Su Song credited, as the predecessor of his working clock, the hydraulic-powered armillary sphere of Zhang Heng (78–139 AD), an earlier Chinese scientist. Su Song was also strongly influenced by the earlier armillary sphere created by Zhang Sixun (976 AD), who also employed the escapement mechanism and used liquid mercury instead of water in the waterwheel of his astronomical clock tower (since liquid mercury would not freeze during winter and would not corrode and rust metal components over time). However, Su Song stated in his writing that after Zhang's death, no one was able to replicate his device, much like his own.

The mechanical clockworks for Su Song's astronomical tower featured a great driving-wheel that was 11 feet in diameter, carrying 36 scoops, into each of which water poured at a uniform rate from the "constant-level tank" (Needham, Fig. 653). The main driving shaft of iron, with its cylindrical necks supported on iron crescent-shaped bearings, ended in a pinion, which engaged a gear wheel at the lower end of the main vertical transmission shaft.

Joseph Needham gives a general description of the clock tower itself:

(Su Song's) clockwork, driven by a water-wheel, and fully enclosed within the tower, rotated an observational armillary sphere on the top platform and a celestial globe in the upper story. Its time-announcing function was further fulfilled visually and audibly by the performances of numerous jacks mounted on the eight superimposed wheels of a time-keeping shaft and appearing at windows in the pagoda-like structure at the front of the tower. Within the building, some 40 ft. high, the driving-wheel was provided with a special form of escapement, and the water was pumped back into the tanks periodically by manual means. The time-annunciator must have included conversion gearing, since it gave 'unequal' as well as equal time signals, and the sphere probably had this. Su Song's treatise on the clock, the Hsin I Hsiang Fa Yao, constitutes a classic of horological engineering.

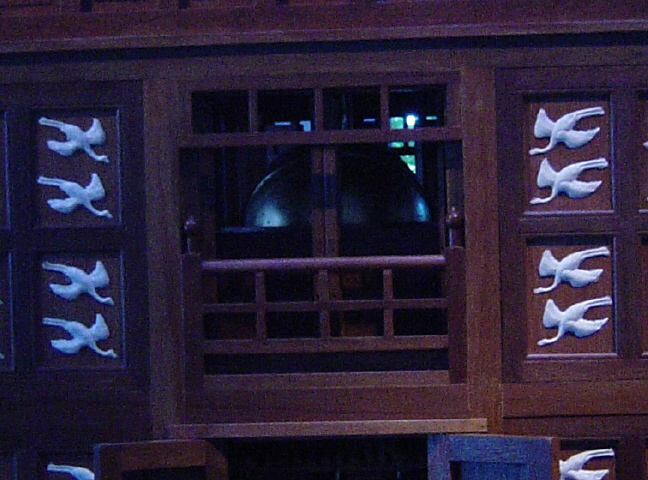
Celestial globe on third floor

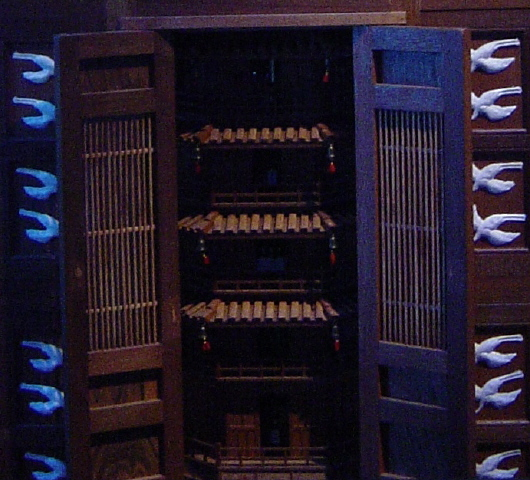
Time display panel

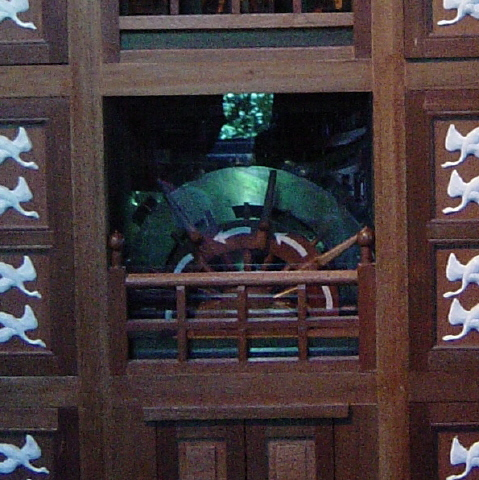
Water wheel with water tank and escapement mechanism

That was figure Fig. 650, while Fig. 656 displays the upper and lower norias with their tanks and the manual wheel for operating them.

Fig. 657 displays a rather miniature and scaled-down picture for the basics of the escapement mechanism in an illustration (from Su's book), with Needham's caption here in this quote: "The 'celestial balance' or escapement mechanism of Su Song's clockwork (Xinyi Xiangfayao, ch. 3, p. 18b)". The latter figure carefully labels:

- a right upper lock
- upper link
- left upper lock
- axle or pivot
- long chain
- upper counterweight
- sump
- checking fork of the lower balancing lever
- coupling tongue
- main (i.e., lower) counterweight

Figure 658 displays a more intricate and most-telling half-page scale drawing of Su Song's large escapement mechanism, labeling these individual parts as they interact with one another:

- arrested spoke
- left upper lock
- scoop being filled by
- water jet from constant-level tank
- small counterweight
- checking fork tripped by a projection pin on the scoop, and forming the near end of
- the lower balancing lever with
- its lower counterweight
- coupling tongue, connected by
- the long chain with
- the upper balancing lever, which has at its far end
- the upper counterweight, and at its near end
- a short length chain connecting it with the upper lock beneath it;
- right upper lock

== The endless chain drive ==
An endless roller chain and sprocket, used in Su Song's clock tower to operate the rotation of the armillary sphere

The world's oldest illustrated depiction of an endless power-transmitting chain drive is from Su Song's horological treatise. It was used in the clockworks for coupling the main drive shaft to the armillary sphere gearbox (rotating three small pinions), as seen in Needham's Fig. 410 and Fig. 652. This belonged to the uppermost end of the main vertical transmission shaft, incorporating right angle gears and oblique gears connected by a short idling shaft. The toothed ring gear called the diurnal motion gear ring was fit around the shell of the armillary sphere along the declination parallel near the southern pole. Although the ancient Greek Philo of Byzantium (3rd century BC) featured a sort of endless belt for his magazine arcuballista, which did not transmit continuous power, the influential source for Su Song's chain drive is most likely the continuously driven chain pump known in China since the Han dynasty (202 BC–220 AD). From his horological treatise, Su Song states:

The chain drive (lit. celestial ladder) is 19.5 ft long (5.9 m). The system is as follows: an iron chain with its links joined together to form an endless circuit hangs down from the upper chain-wheel which is concealed by the tortoise-and-cloud (column supporting the armillary sphere centrally), and passes also round the lower chain-wheel which is mounted on the main driving-shaft. Whenever one link moves, it moves forward one tooth of the diurnal motion gear-ring and rotates the Component of the Three Arrangers of Time, thus following the motion of the heavens.

In addition, the motion gear rings and the upper drive wheel both had 600 teeth, which by Su's mathematical precision carefully calculated measured units of the day in a division of 1/600. These gears, having 600 teeth, thus ensured the division of the day into measurements of 2 minutes and 24 seconds each.

== Su Song's armillary sphere ==
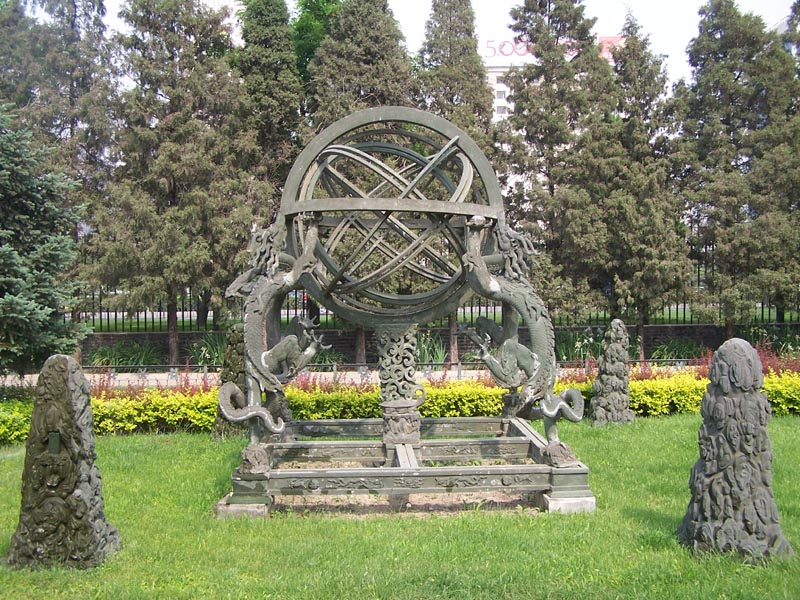
A modern replica of a Ming dynasty era armillary sphere found at the Beijing Ancient Observatory

In Joseph Needham's third volume of Science and Civilization in China, the drawing for Fig. 159 displays a drawing of Su Song's armillary sphere (as depicted in his 11th century treatise), complete with three 'nests' or layers of mechanically rotated rings. It was the earlier Chinese astronomer Li Chun-feng of the Tang dynasty who in 633 AD created the first armillary sphere with three layers to calibrate multiple aspects of astronomical observation. Zhang's armillary sphere has often been compared to that of the 13th century monarch Alfonso X of Castile in Islamic-era Spain. The chief difference was that Alfonso's instrument featured an arrangement for making measurements of the azimuth and altitude, which was present in the Arabic tradition, while Su Song's armillary sphere was duly graduated. For the drawing of Su's armillary sphere, the listing of components are:

- The Outer Nest
  - meridian circle
  - horizon circle
  - outer equator circle
- The Middle Nest
  - solstitial colure circle
  - ecliptic circle
  - diurnal motion gear-ring, connecting with the power-drive
- The Inner Nest
  - polar-mounted declination ring or hour-angle circle, with
  - sighting tube attached to it and strengthened by a
  - diametral brace
- Other Parts
  - vertical column concealing the transmission shaft
  - supporting columns in the form of dragons
  - cross-piece of the base, incorporating water-levels
  - south polar pivot
  - north polar pivot

== Transmission of Su's text and his legacy ==
When Su Song's Xinyi Xiangfayao was written in 1092 and the horological monograph finalized and presented in 1094, his work was published and widely printed in the north (see woodblock printing and movable type of Bi Sheng). In the south, printing and circulation of his work was not widely distributed until Shi Yuanzhi of Jiangsu had it printed there in 1172.

When presenting his clocktower design to the Emperor Zhezong, Su Song equated the constant flow of water with the continuous movements of the heavens, the latter of which symbolized the unceasing power of the emperor. This appealed to the emperor, who featured artwork representing the clocktower on vehicles of major imperial processions, as illustrated in the Illustration of the Imperial Grand Carriage Procession of 1053.

The later Ming dynasty/Qing dynasty scholar Qian Zeng (1629–1699) held an old volume of Su's work, which he faithfully reproduced in a newly printed edition. He took special care in avoiding any rewording or inconsistencies with the original text as well. Again, it was later reprinted by Zhang Xizu (1799–1844).

Su Song's treatise on astronomical clockwork was not the only one made in China during his day, as the Song Shi (compiled in 1345) records the written treatise of the Shuiyunhun Tianjiyao (Wade–Giles: Shui Yun Hun Thien Chi Yao; lit. Essentials of the [Technique of] making Astronomical Apparatus revolve by Water-Power), written by Juan Taifa. However, this treatise no longer survives.

European Jesuit visitors to China like Matteo Ricci and Nicolas Trigault briefly wrote about Chinese clocks with wheel-driven mechanisms, but others mistakenly believed that the Chinese had never advanced beyond the stage of the clepsydra, incense clock, and sundial. They thought that advanced mechanical clockworks were new to China and viewed them as innovations that Europeans could introduce. Although not as prominent as in the Song period, contemporary Chinese texts of the Ming dynasty (1368–1644) described a relatively unbroken history of mechanical clocks in China, from the 13th to the 16th century. However, Su Song's clock tower was not independent of external forces to power its movement, as it relied on a waterwheel via a chain drive mechanism. It was thus not fully mechanical like late medieval European clocks, which typically used descending weights to drive their gears and escapement, requiring periodic winding but functioning without continuous external forces.

In the realm of modern research, the British biochemist and historian of Chinese science Joseph Needham (1900–1995) (known as Li Yuese in China) conducted extensive research and analysis of Su Song's texts and various achievements in his Science and Civilization in China book series. Joseph Needham also related many detailed passages from Su's contemporary medieval Chinese sources on the life of Su and his achievements known in his day. In 1956, John Christiansen reconstructed a model of Su Song's clocktower in a famous drawing, which garnered attention in the West towards 11th-century Chinese engineering. A miniature model of Su Song's clock was reconstructed by John Cambridge and is now on display at the National Science Museum at South Kensington, London. In China, the clocktower was reconstructed to one-fifth its actual scale by Wang Zhenduo, who worked for the Chinese Historical Museum in Beijing in the 1950s.

== See also ==
- Cartographers
- Chinese inventions and discoveries
- Chinese writers
- Clock tower
- Mineralogists
- Technology of the Song dynasty
- Water clock
- Zhang Heng, second-century inventor of water-powered armillary sphere
