= Zhan Xiyuan =

14th-century Chinese inventor and engineer

Zhan Xiyuan (Chinese: 詹希元; pinyin: Zhān Xīyuán; Wade–Giles: Chan His-Yuan) was a Chinese inventor, engineer, and calligrapher who lived during the late Yuan dynasty (1271–1368) and early Ming dynasty (1368-1644). He is best known for creating the Five-Wheel Hourglass (Chinese: 五轮沙漏; pinyin: wǒlún shālòu), a sophisticated mechanical timepiece that represented a significant advancement in 14th-century Chinese horology.

== Invention of the Five-Wheel Hourglass ==
In either 1360 or the 1370s (sources disagree), Zhan Xiyuan developed his most famous invention, the Five-Wheel Hourglass. This timekeeping device integrated principles of sand-powered mechanics with gear transmission systems, making it one of the earliest mechanical clocks in China.

== Technical design ==
The Five-Wheel Hourglass featured an innovative mechanism in which sand flowed from a funnel-shaped container into sand buckets arranged around the perimeter of the primary wheel. As these buckets filled with sand, they generated the driving force for the device. This motion was transmitted through a complex gear train composed of multiple wheels.

The clock included:

- A primary wheel driven directly by falling sand
- A series of interconnected transmission gears
- A central horizontal wheel rotating on a central axis
- A pointer attached to the central wheel that indicated time on a calibrated dial

The display closely resembled modern mechanical clock faces, with a rotating pointer marking time divisions. According to historical records, "With a sand wheel as the power source and four pairs of gears as the transmission system, it was able to indicate time by its hand on the clock dial.

== Automata features ==
Beyond its timekeeping function, the device also incorporated early automata. Two wooden figures were mounted on the clock, programmed to strike drums at regular intervals to announce the time. These figures were activated by a mechanical dialing device integrated into the central wheel, appearing at full hours and quarter-hour intervals (ke, 刻) in traditional Chinese timekeeping.

== Historical significance ==
The Five-Wheel Hourglass marked a significant development in Chinese timekeeping technology. For one, its innovative use of sand as a power source eliminated the freezing issues that plagued water clocks in northern China. Another advantage of replacing water with sand was that it allowed the device to achieve greater precision than traditional water clocks (漏刻), sidestepping the inconsistencies introduced by variable water pressure. Additionally, it incorporated a clock face, further enhancing functionality. Zhan’s work built upon the foundational advancements of earlier clockmakers such as Su Song and Guo Shoujing. Su Song’s 11th-century water-driven astronomical clock tower, with its use of escapement mechanisms, and Guo Shoujing’s 13th-century innovations in precision astronomical timekeeping devices both paved the way for Zhan’s evolution of these principles into his timekeeping solution.

== Legacy ==
Although the original device has not survived, historical descriptions have enabled modern researchers to analyze its mechanical principles. In 2019, scholars reconstructed Zhan's sand clock based on historical documentation, confirming its mechanical feasibility through prototype testing.

Zhan's innovation emerged around the time that the Ming dynasty would overthrow the Yuan dynasty. This chaotic environment may have hindered wider adoption. Records indicate that Zhu Yuanzhang, the founding emperor of the Ming dynasty, was preoccupied with consolidating power and did not actively support technological advancements, potentially limiting further development of this technology. Despite this, Zhan Xiyuan's work remains an important milestone in the history of Chinese mechanical engineering and horology. In the 1570s, Zhou Shuxue would go on to devise an improved version of Zhan's sand clock leveraging six wheels rather than five.

Zhan was executed during the Ming dynasty by a literary inquisition.

== See also ==
- Yi Xing
- Su Song
- Guo Shoujing
