= Ibn Khalaf al-Muradi =

Andalusian engineer

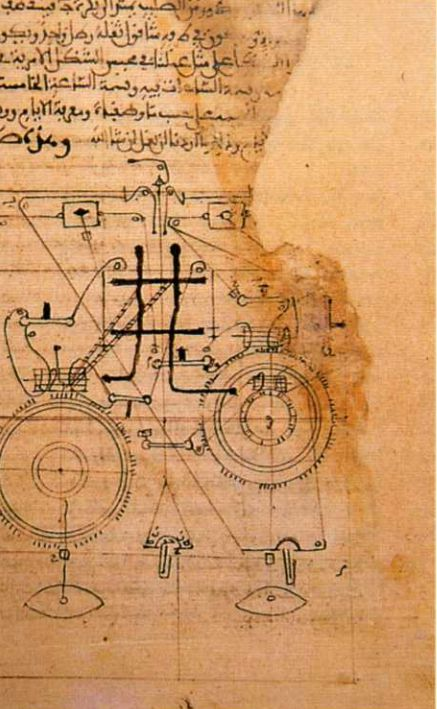
Fragment of The Book of Secrets in the Results of Thoughts. 11th century

Ibn Khalaf al-Murādī, (أبو جعفر علي ابن خلف المرادي; 11th century) was an Andalusian engineer.

Al-Murādī was the author of the technological manuscript entitled Kitāb al-asrār fī natā'ij al-afkār (Arabic: كتاب الأسرار في نتائج الأفكار, The Book of Secrets in the Results of Thoughts or The Book of Secrets in the Results of Ideas). It was copied and used at the court of Alfonso VI of León and Castile in Christian Spain in the 11th century.

The manuscript provides information about a "Castle and Gazelle Clock" and many other forms of complicated clocks and ingenious devices.

In 2008, the Book of Secrets of al-Muradi was published in facsimile, translated in English/Italian/French/Arabic and in an electronic edition with all machines interpreted in 3D, by the Italian study center Leonardo3.
