= List of Chinese scientists =

This is a list of notable Chinese scientists.

- Ba Denian
- T. T. Chang
- JS Chiao
- Chang Chi-yun
- Chao Yuen Ren
- Chen Hang
- Chen Xing
- Chen Ziyuan
- Chien Wei-zang
- Coching Chu
- Ding Zhongli
- Jiamo Fu
- Gao Zhan
- Yingjie Jay Guo
- Guo Zhengtang
- He Xiantu
- Kenneth Hsu
- Hongjia Huang
- Jia Lanpo
- Jiang Ximing
- Jianping Li
- Robert C. T. Lee
- Li Lanjuan
- Li Sanli
- Li Shu-hua
- Lucas Pu
- York Liao
- Liu Gaolian
- Yuanzhang Liu
- Ma Jun
- Ouyang Ziyuan
- Pan Jianwei
- Pan Jiazheng
- Pei Wenzhong
- Pu Zhelong
- Ren Mei'e
- Shao Xianghua
- Shen Kuo
- Shi Yafeng
- Song Yingxing
- Su Song
- Sun Jiadong
- Sun Laiyan
- Sun Jinliang
- Tan Jiazhen
- Tong Dizhou
- Tu Youyou
- Roger Y. Tsien
- Wang Yongzhi
- Wang You
- Wang Zhongcheng
- Wei Pu
- Weng Wenhao
- Wo Weihan
- Hsien Wu
- Wu Mengchao
- Xie Xuejing
- Yang Fuyu
- Xiangzhong Yang
- Yang Zhongjian
- Yao Zhen
- Ye Duzheng
- Ye Peijian
- Xiaobo Yu
- Yu Xiaogang
- Zhang Heng
- Zhang Sixun
- Zhang Yongzhen
- Zhao Jiuzhang
- Zhao Xijin
- Zhao Yufen
- Zheng Ji
- Bangxing Zhou
- Zhong Nanshan
- Zhou Guozhi
- Zhu S-H

== See also ==
- List of Chinese mathematicians
- History of science and technology in China
