= List of Chinese mathematicians =

This is a list of Chinese mathematicians. With a history spanning over three millennia, Chinese mathematics is believed to have initially developed largely independently of other cultures.

== Classical ==
- Jing Fang: 78 – 37 BC
- Liu Xin: c. 50 BC – 23 AD
- Zhang Heng: 78 – 139 AD
- Liu Hong: 129 – 210 AD
- Cai Yong: 132 – 192 AD
- Liu Hui: 225 – 295 AD
- Wang Fan: 228 – 266 AD
- Sun Tzu: c. 3rd – 5th century AD
- Zu Chongzhi: 429 – 500 AD
- Zu Gengzhi: c. 450 – c. 520 AD

== Middle Imperial ==
- Zhen Luan: 535–566
- Wang Xiaotong: 580–640
- Li Chunfeng: 602–670
- Yi Xing: 683–727
- Wei Pu: 11th century
- Jia Xian: 1010–1070
- Su Song: 1020–1101
- Shen Kuo: 1031–1095
- Li Zhi: 1192–1279
- Qin Jiushao: c. 1202–1261
- Guo Shoujing: 1231–1316
- Yang Hui: c. 1238–1298
- Zhu Shijie: 1249–1314

== Late Imperial ==
=== 16th century ===
- Cheng Dawei: 1533–1606
- Zhu Zaiyu: 1536–1611

=== 17th century ===
- Xu Guangqi: 1562–1633
- Minggatu: 1692–1763

=== 18th century ===
- Li Rui: 1768–1817

=== 19th century ===
- Li Shanlan: 1810–1882
- Xiong Qinglai: 1893–1969

== Modern ==
=== 20th century ===
- Su Buqing: 1902–2003
- Pao-Lu Hsu: 1910–1970
- Hua Luogeng: 1910–1985
- Ke Zhao: 1910–2002
- Wei-Liang Chow: 1911–1995
- Shiing-Shen Chern: 1911–2004
- Chien Wei-zang: 1912–2010
- Ky Fan: 1914–2010
- Chia-Chiao Lin: 1916–2013
- Wu Wenjun: 1919–2017
- Yuan-Shih Chow: 1924–2022
- Gu Chaohao: 1926–2012
- Daoxing Xia: b. 1930
- Wang Yuan: 1930–2021
- Chen Jingrun: 1933–1996
- Pan Chengdong: 1934–1997
- Yum-Tong Siu: b. 1943
- Peng Shige: b. 1947
- Shing-Tung Yau: b. 1949, Fields Medal recipient
- Yitang Zhang: b. 1955
- Gang Tian: b. 1958
- Jeffrey Yi-Lin Forrest: b. 1959
- Huai-Dong Cao: b. 1959
- Shou-Wu Zhang: b. 1962
- Weinan E: b. 1963
- Kefeng Liu: b. 1965
- Terence Tao: b.1975
- Wei Zhang: b. 1981
- Zhiwei Yun: b. 1982
- Chenyang Xu: b. 1981
- Eddie Woo: b. 1985

== See also ==
- List of Chinese scientists
