= Ma Jun =

Ma Jun may refer to:

- Ma Jun (mechanical engineer) (fl. 220–265), ancient Chinese mechanical engineer
- Ma Jun (historian) (born 1953), Chinese historian
- Ma Jun (environmental engineer) (born 1962), Chinese environmental engineer
- Ma Jun (environmentalist) (born 1968), Chinese environmentalist
- Ma Jun (footballer) (born 1989), Chinese footballer
