= Yuanzhang =

Yuanzhang may refer to:

- Liu Yuanzhang (Chinese: 刘源张; 1925–2014), professor of quality management engineering at Shanghai University
- Ma Yuanzhang (Chinese: 马元章; died 1920), Chinese Sufi master
- Zhu Yuanzhang (Chinese: 朱元璋; 1328–1398), better known as the Hongwu Emperor, founding emperor of the Ming dynasty
- 22572 Yuanzhang, minor planet
