= Li Jianping =

Li Jianping may refer to:

- Li Jianping (politician, born 1918), Chinese politician, director of the China Earthquake Administration, vice minister of light industry, vice minister of geology, and vice minister of fuel and chemical industries.
- Li Jianping (politician, born 1954), Chinese politician.
- Li Jianping (politician, born 1960) (1960–2024), Chinese politician in Inner Mongolia, executed for corruption
- Jianping Li, Chinese meteorologist
