= Li Rui (disambiguation) =

Li Rui (李锐; 1917–2019) was a Chinese politician. The name may also refer to:

- Li Rui (footballer) (李锐; born 1994), Chinese footballer
- Li Rui (hurdler) (李蕊; born 1979), retired female hurdler
- Li Rui (mathematician) (李銳; 1768–1817), Chinese mathematician
- Li Rui (sport shooter), Chinese sport shooter at events such as the 2010 Asian Games
- Li Rui (writer) (李锐; born 1949), short-story writer and novelist
