= Zu Geng =

Zu Geng is the name of:

- Zu Geng of Shang (died 1184 BC), Shang dynasty king
- Zu Gengzhi (c. 450–520), Liang dynasty mathematician
