= Northeast Normal University =

Public normal university in Changchun, Jilin, China

- 东北师范大学
- Former names: Northeast University, Jilin Normal University
- Motto: 勤奋创新，为人师表
- Motto in English: Be diligent and creative in studies, be exemplary in virtue
- Type: Public
- Established: 1946; 80 years ago
- President: Xu Haiyang
- Academic staff: 1,294
- Undergraduates: 15,191
- Postgraduates: 6,599
- Location: Nanguan, Changchun, Jilin, China; 43°51′26″N 125°19′38″E
- Campus: 150 ha
- Website: nenu.edu.cn

Chinese name
- Simplified Chinese: 东北师范大学
- Traditional Chinese: 東北師範大學
Transcriptions
Standard Mandarin
- Hanyu Pinyin: Dōngběi Shīfàn Dàxué

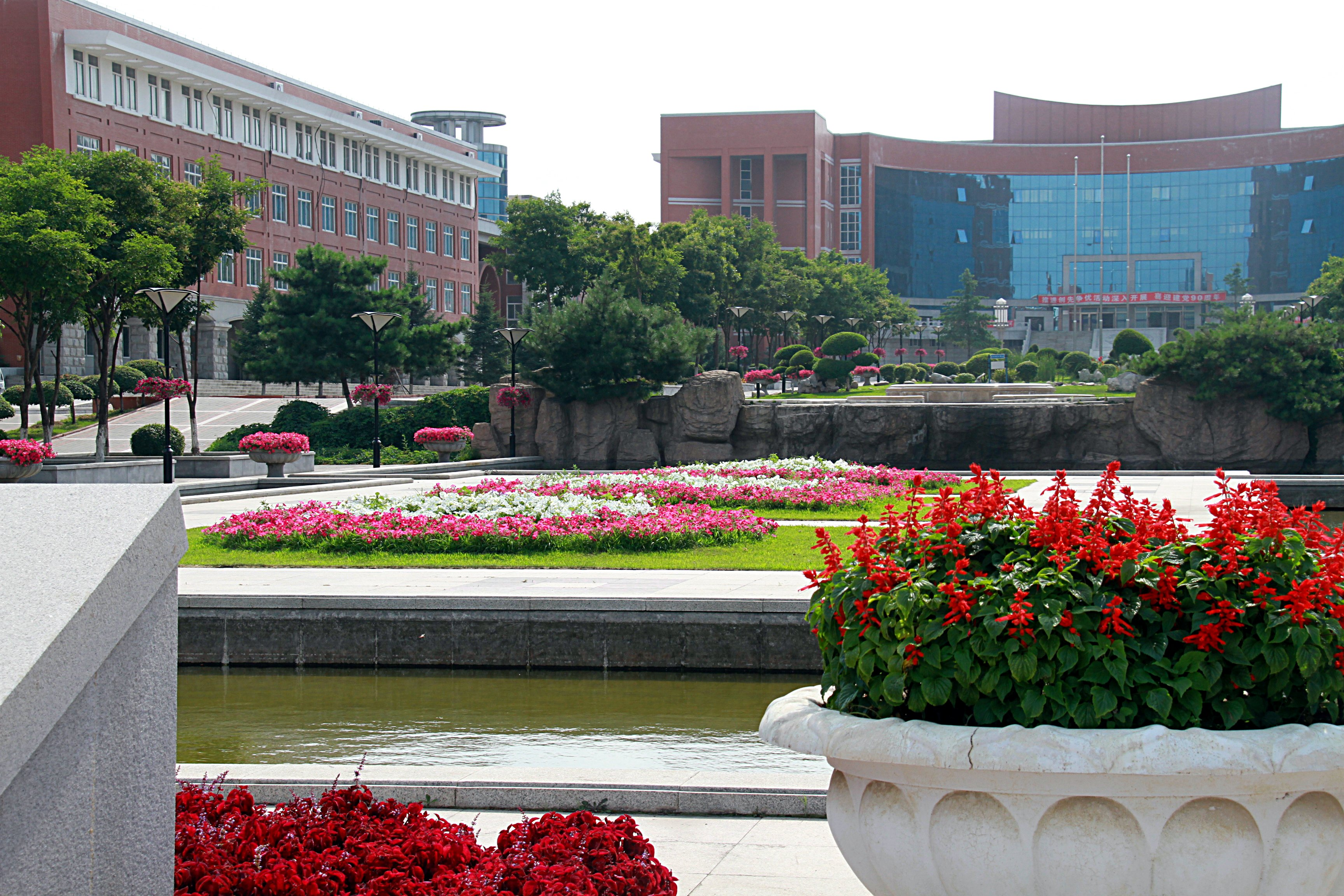
School campus

Northeast Normal University (NENU; 东北师范大学) is a public normal university in Changchun, Jilin, China. It is affiliated with the Ministry of Education, and co-funded by the Ministry of Education and the Jilin Provincial People's Government. The university is part of Project 211 and the Double First-Class Construction.

== History ==
Northeast Normal University (NENU) is an institution of higher learning under the direct administration of the Ministry of Education, being selected as one of the universities given priority in construction in the "211 Project". The university, in Changchun city, Jilin province, occupies an area of 1,500,000 square meters, including 800,000 square meters of the main campus and 700,000 square meters of the new campus.

NENU's predecessor is Northeast University, the first comprehensive university founded by the Communist Party in northeast China in Benxi, Liaoning province, in February 1946. In 1949, the school was moved to Changchun City and renamed Northeast Normal University in 1950.

== Administration ==
=== College and departments ===
- School of Psychology
- Faculty of Education
- School of Politics and Law
- School of Economics
- School of Business
- School of Chinese Language and Literature
- School of History and Culture
- School of Foreign Languages
- School of Music
- School of Fine Arts
- School of Mathematics and Statistics
- School of Computer Science
- School of Software
- School of Physics
- School of Chemistry
- School of Life Science
- College of Urban and Environmental Science
- School of Physical Education
- School of Media Science
- International Relations Institute and Marxism Research Institute
- Institute for the History of Ancient Civilizations (IHAC)

NENU comprises 19 schools, 56 undergraduate specialties and a graduate school, which offers 145 M.A. degree specialties, and 77 Ph.D. degree specialties. There are nine faculties authorized to confer doctoral degrees, 11 disciplines with post-doctoral R&D stations, five key disciplines of the National Institution of Higher Education, six disciplines among the construction projects of the key disciplines of the national "Tenth Five-Year Plan" and the "211 Project" and 18 disciplines among the key subject program of Jilin Province.

Three disciplines are personnel training and scientific research bases of the national fundamental disciplines of arts and sciences; two disciplines are among the key research bases for Humanities and Social Sciences of the Ministry of Education; eight laboratories and research centers are authorized by the ministry. In addition, NENU possesses several national training programs and research institutes such as Preparatory School for Chinese Students to Japan (PSCSJ).

=== Staff ===
There are 1297 full-time teachers, including 354 professors, 429 associate professors and 272 Ph.D. supervisors. There is one academician of the Chinese Academy of Sciences, one academician of the Third World Academy of Sciences and 11 members of the Academic Degree Committee of the State Council. In addition, there are five professors in the "Yangtze River Scholar Program", one recipient of the Ho Leung Ho Lee Prize, four recipients of National Outstanding Youth Fund, five national outstanding young and middle age specialists, three professors selected for the "One Hundred Experts Program" (a national personnel development project organized by the Chinese Academy of Sciences), 25 teachers selected for the personnel construction program sponsored by the Ministry of Education, and two state-level renowned teachers, 14 committee members of the Guiding Committee for Higher Education Instruction and 13 outstanding individuals in education system as well.

== Student life ==
There are 22,221 full-time students in NENU, including 15,191 undergraduates, 6,599 M.A. and Ph.D. students, and 431 foreign students.

NENU preserves education and teaching as "the foundation of school setting" and has formed a concept of education which is "BE DILIGENT AND CREATIVE IN STUDIES" and "BE EXEMPLARY IN VIRTUE". The quality of students has been continuously improved and for this. The university has enjoyed high prestige in basic education, and received a positive evaluation from the society. NENU was named a "National Advanced Unit for Job-Hunting" by the State Council, becoming one of only four universities to be so named nationally in 2004.

== Research and education ==
NENU regards scientific research as "the basis of institution strengthening" and places great emphasis on scientific research and has made significant achievements. The natural science research and education was ranked the 18th among all universities in China in 2013.

== Notable alumni ==
- Ma Jun, historian and professor

== See also ==
- Join Network Studio of NENU
