= Institute for the History of Ancient Civilizations =

Chinese classics research institute

The Institute for the History of Ancient Civilizations (IHAC) is a graduate research institute on ancient history, ancient languages, and archaeology at the Northeast Normal University in Changchun, China (Jilin Province). The IHAC was the first Chinese institute to establish chairs and academic research positions for Assyriology, Hittitology, Egyptology, and Classics in a broad sense (Greek and Roman philology, ancient history, classical archaeology). In 2016, the chair for Byzantine Studies at Northeast Normal University was connected with the IHAC.

The Institute for the History of Ancient Civilizations was founded in 1984, after the Chinese professors Zhou Gucheng (Fudan University), Wu Yujin (Wuhan University), and Lin Zhichun (Northeast Normal University) jointly appealed to the Ministry of Education to establish such an institution, successfully arguing that to understand Western nations, it was necessary to study their ancient as well as their modern history.

Since 1986, the IHAC has annually published the Journal of Ancient Civilizations (JAC). The JAC aims to publish the work of Chinese and international scholars dealing with history, art, archaeology, philology, and linguistics of the ancient Near Eastern and Mediterranean region. The articles in this international journal are written in English, German, or French. Normally, the faculty staff is Chinese. But annually, three special research and teaching positions are explicitly reserved for foreign visiting professors.

== Bibliography ==
- Brashear, William (1990): "Classics in China." The Classical Journal. 86 (1): 73–78.
- Brashear, William (1998): "China Update 1997." The Classical Journal. 94 (1): 81–85.
- Günther, Sven (2014): "Past and Future of IHAC. International Conference for the 30th Anniversary of the Institute for the History of Ancient Civilizations." Journal of Ancient Civilizations. 29: 117–120.
- Günther, Sven (2019): "Classics in China: An Update." Ancient West & East. 18: 225–230.
