= Sun Jinliang =

Chinese scientist

Sun Jinliang (simplified Chinese: 孙晋良; traditional Chinese: 孫晉良; pinyin: Sūn Jìnliáng, born January 1946) is an academician of the Chinese Academy of Engineering (CAE) and professor of material science and engineering in Shanghai University.
