= Shu-Hong Zhu =

Chinese scientist

Dr. Shu-Hong Zhu is a scientist best known for his pioneering research on the effectiveness of telephone based tobacco cessation (quitline) programs.

== Career ==
He is currently a professor of family medicine and public health at the University of California, San Diego. Dr. Zhu also serves as the Director of the Center for Research and Intervention in Tobacco Control at the same institution.
