= Liu Gaolian =

Chinese scientist

Gaolian Liu (Chinese: 刘高联; pinyin: Líu Gāolián, born July, 1932) is a scientist of Engineering Thermal Physics and Hydrodynamics, a professor of Shanghai University, and an academician of the Chinese Academy of Sciences.

== Biography ==
Professor Liu has taught at Shanghai University Mechanics Research Institute. He has long been engaged in the research of pneumatic theory of turbomachine and hydromechanics. Based on Wu Zhonghua's 3D fluid theory of turbomachine, he established a new theory system with the variation theory as a foundation. Liu introduced a systematic channel of the establishment and transformation of the hydromechanical variation principle. He was the first scientist to set up variation principle and broad-sense variation principle families of positive proposition, reverse proposition and cross proposition of turbomachine's 3D flow.

Professor Liu discovered optimized design theory about the 3D cascade and runner, combined with optimized cybernetics. He developed a field change and variation theory and a finite element method in which various unknown interfaces can be automatically captured. He also put forward a series of new general functions for hydromechanics, and explored general theory and solution about mapping space of 3D flow reverse - cross proposition. In the last few decades, Liu has emphasized new directions, such as reverse proposition of nonsteady pneumatic mechanics, reverse proposition of multi-working condition points hydromechanics and pneumatic - thermal - elastic coupling theory.

Professor Liu won the second award of national natural science in 1987, and was elected an academician of the Chinese Academy of Sciences in 1999.
