= Zhou Bangxin =

Chinese material scientist

Zhou Bangxin (Chinese: 周邦新, born December, 1935), academician of the Chinese Academy of Engineering (CAE), professor of material science and engineering at Shanghai University.
