= Chen Ziyuan =

Chinese agricultural scientist and nuclear physicist

Chen Ziyuan (simplified Chinese: 陈子元; traditional Chinese: 陳子元; pinyin: Chén Zǐyuán; born 7 September 1924 in Shanghai) is a Chinese agricultural scientist and nuclear physicist. He is the main founding father of China's nuclear agriculture.

== Biography ==
Chen, a native of Yin County (present-day Yinzhou, Ningbo) of Zhejiang, studied at Daxia University in Shanghai. After graduation, he taught at Daxia, which became part of East China Normal University in 1952.

In 1953, Chen became an associate professor of Zhejiang Agricultural University (previous and current Zhejiang University). In 1958, Chen founded the first laboratory in China to study agricultural science by nuclear physics techniques, especially the radioactive isotope.

From 1979 to 1989, Chen was the vice-president and then President of the Zhejiang Agricultural University.

Currently, Chen is a professor at Zhejiang University College of Agriculture and Biotechnology.

Chen was head of the Zhejiang University Institute of Nuclear Agricultural Sciences (浙江大学原子核农业科学研究所) and was head of the State Key Laboratory of Nuclear Agricultural Sciences of the Ministry of Agriculture. He was the Director-general of the Chinese Society of Nuclear Agricultural Sciences (中国原子能农学会).

Chen was a vice-president of the Zhejiang Association of Science and Technology (浙江省科学技术协会). Chen was elected to Academician of the Chinese Academy of Sciences in 1991.
