= Guo Zhengtang =

Chinese geologist

- Born: April 8, 1964 (age 62)
- Education: Peking University (BA); Pierre and Marie Curie University (PhD)
- Scientific career
- Fields: Geology; Climate change
- Website: sourcedb.igg.cas.cn/cn/zjrck/200907/t20090713_2065546.html; sourcedb.cas.cn/sourcedb_igg_cas/en/zjrck/200907/t20090713_2065546.html

Guo Zhengtang (Chinese: 郭正堂; pinyin: Guō Zhèngtáng; born April 8, 1964) is a Chinese geologist specialized in the Cenozoic.

== Education and early life ==
Guo was born in Shuozhou, Shanxi Province in 1964. He received his Bachelor of Arts degree in Geology from Peking University in 1983, and earned Ph.D. of soil science from the Pierre and Marie Curie University, France in 1990.

== Research and career ==
Guo's research mainly focuses on the eolian sediments of the Chinese Loess Plateau and ancient climate change. He was the Director-general of the Institute of Earth Environment, Chinese Academy of Sciences during 2002-2006. He was a Vice-President of the INQUA Commission on Paleoclimates. He and his colleagues extended the loess records in China from ~8 Ma to ~22 Ma.
