= Shen Kuo =

Chinese scientist and statesman

- 沈括
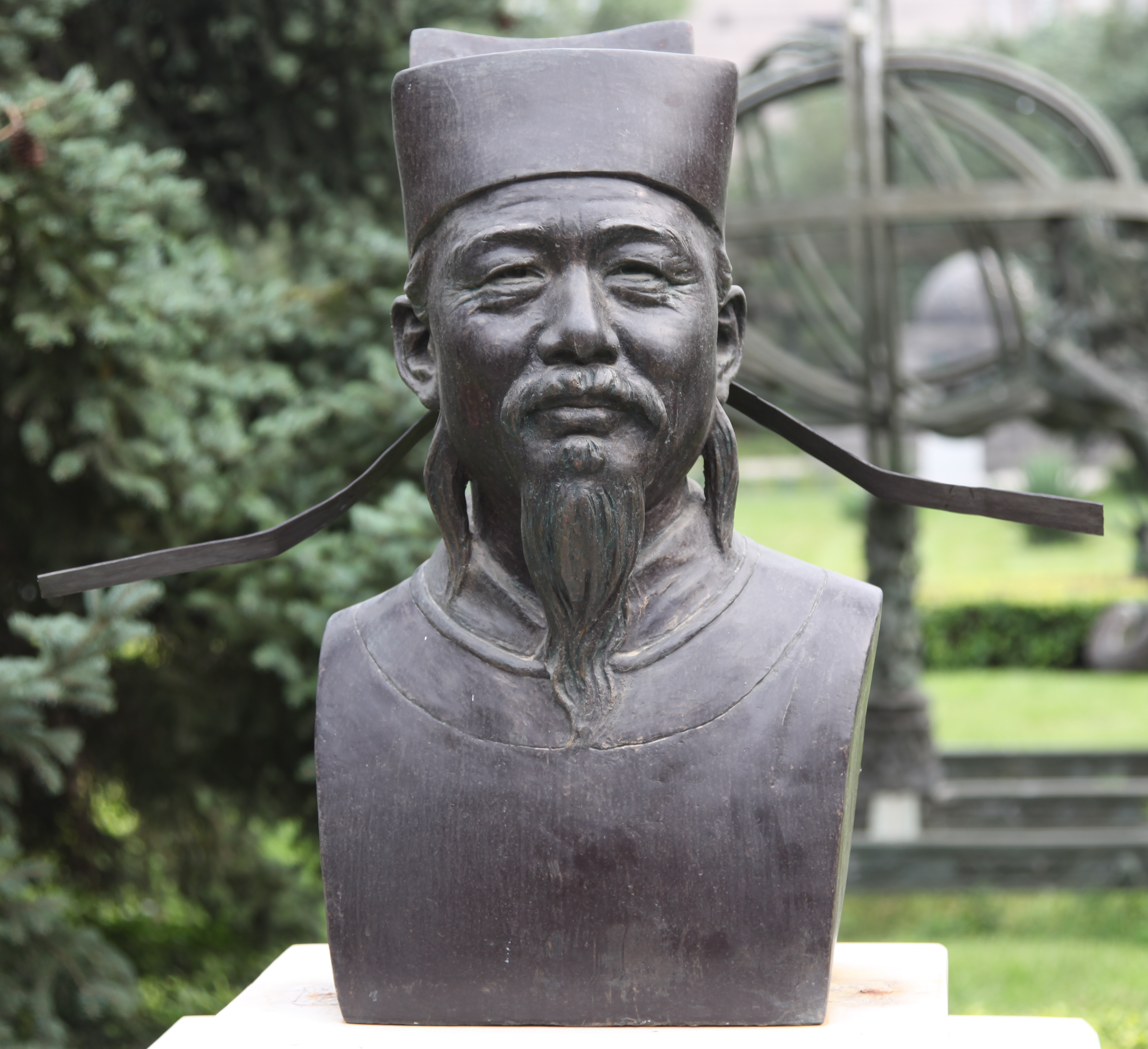
- Bust of Shen at the Beijing Ancient Observatory
- Born: 1031; Qiantang, Northern Song dynasty
- Died: 1095 (aged 63–64); Runzhou, Northern Song dynasty
- Known for: Geomorphology; Climate change; Atmospheric refraction; True north; Retrogradation; Camera obscura; Raised-relief map; fixing the position of the pole star; correcting lunar and solar errors
- Scientific career
- Fields: Agronomy; Astronomy; Archaeology; Anatomy; Antiquarianism; Mathematics; Pharmacology; Medical science; Entomology; Mineralogy; Music; Geomorphology; Sedimentology; Optical engineering; Soil science; Encyclopedism; Geomagnetics; Optics; Hydraulics; Hydraulic engineering; Mechanical engineering; Metallurgy; Metaphysics; Meteorology; Climatology; Cartography; Botany; Zoology; Economics; Finance; Military strategy; Ethnography; Divination; Art criticism; Philosophy; Poetry; Politics; Public Administration
- Workplaces: Hanlin Academy

Shen Kuo
- Shen’s name in regular Chinese characters
- Chinese: 沈括
Transcriptions
Standard Mandarin
- Hanyu Pinyin: Shěn Kuò
- Wade–Giles: Shen^{3} K'uo^{4}
- IPA: [ʂə̀n kʰwô]
Wu
- Suzhounese: Sen^{3} Kuaeq^{7}
Yue: Cantonese
- Yale Romanization: Sám Kut
- Jyutping: Sam^{2} Kut^{3}
- IPA: [sɐm˧˥ kʰut̚˧]
Southern Min
- Hokkien POJ: Sím Koat
- Tâi-lô: Sím Kuat

Shen Kuo (Note: Pronunciation in Mainland China) (Chinese: 沈括; 1031–1095) or Shen Gua, (Note: Pronunciation in Taiwan) courtesy name Cunzhong (存中) and pseudonym Mengqi (now usually given as Mengxi) Weng (夢溪翁), was a Chinese polymath, scientist, and statesman of the Northern Song dynasty. Shen was a master in many fields of study including mathematics, optics, and horology. In his career as a civil servant, he became a finance minister, governmental state inspector, head official for the Bureau of Astronomy in the Song court, Assistant Minister of Imperial Hospitality, and also served as an academic chancellor. At court his political allegiance was to the Reformist faction known as the New Policies Group, headed by Chancellor Wang Anshi (1021–1085).

In his Dream Pool Essays or Dream Torrent Essays (夢溪筆談; Mengxi Bitan) of 1088, Shen was the first to describe the magnetic needle compass, which would be used for navigation (first described in Europe by Alexander Neckam in 1187). Shen discovered the concept of true north in terms of magnetic declination towards the north pole, with experimentation of suspended magnetic needles and "the improved meridian determined by Shen's [astronomical] measurement of the distance between the pole star and true north". This was the decisive step in human history to make compasses more useful for navigation, and may have been a concept unknown in Europe for another four hundred years (evidence of German sundials made circa 1450 show markings similar to Chinese geomancers' compasses in regard to declination).

Alongside his colleague Wei Pu, Shen planned to map the orbital paths of the Moon and the planets in an intensive five-year project involving daily observations, yet this was thwarted by political opponents at court. To aid his work in astronomy, Shen Kuo made improved designs of the armillary sphere, gnomon, sighting tube, and invented a new type of inflow water clock. Shen Kuo devised a geological hypothesis for land formation (geomorphology), based upon findings of inland marine fossils, knowledge of soil erosion, and the deposition of silt. He also proposed a hypothesis of gradual climate change, after observing ancient petrified bamboos that were preserved underground in a dry northern habitat that would not support bamboo growth in his time. He was the first literary figure in China to mention the use of the drydock to repair boats suspended out of water, and also wrote of the effectiveness of the relatively new invention of the canal pound lock. Although not the first to invent camera obscura, Shen noted the relation of the focal point of a concave mirror and that of the pinhole. Shen wrote extensively about movable type printing invented by Bi Sheng (990–1051), and because of his written works the legacy of Bi Sheng and the modern understanding of the earliest movable type has been handed down to later generations. Following an old tradition in China, Shen created a raised-relief map while inspecting borderlands. His description of an ancient crossbow mechanism he unearthed as an amateur archaeologist proved to be a Jacob's staff, a surveying tool which was not known in Europe until described by Levi ben Gerson in 1321.

Shen Kuo wrote several other books besides the Dream Pool Essays, yet much of the writing in his other books has not survived. Some of Shen's poetry was preserved in posthumous written works. Although much of his focus was on technical and scientific issues, he had an interest in divination and the supernatural, the latter including his vivid description of unidentified flying objects from eyewitness testimony. He also wrote commentary on ancient Daoist and Confucian texts.

== Life ==
=== Birth and youth ===
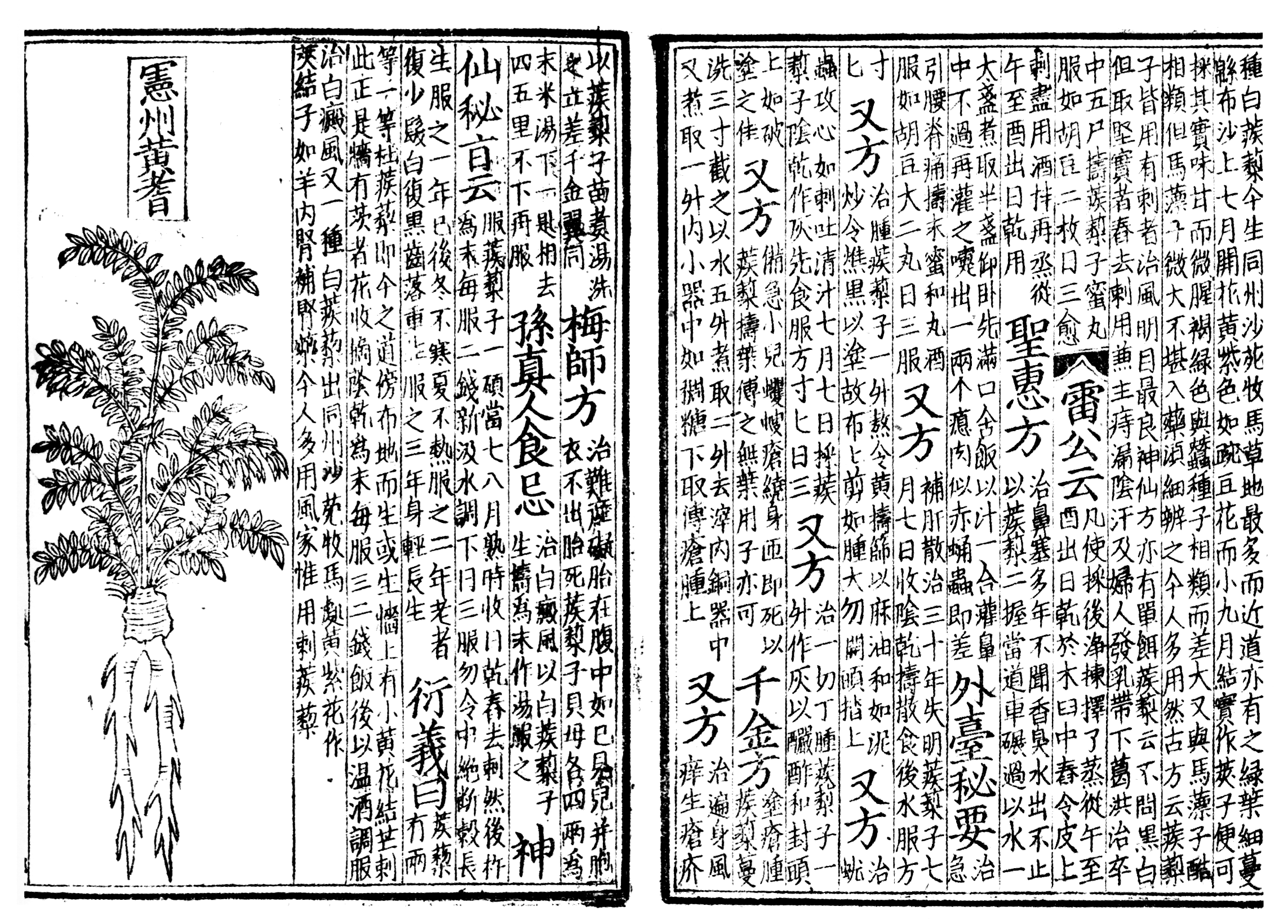
The Bencao on traditional Chinese medicine; printed with woodblock printing press in 1249; Shen grew ill often as a child, and so developed an interest in medicinal cures.

Shen Kuo was born in Qiantang (modern-day Hangzhou) in the year 1031. His father Shen Zhou (沈周; 978–1052) was a somewhat lower-class gentry figure serving in official posts on the provincial level; his mother was from a family of equal status in Suzhou, with her maiden name being Xu (許). Shen Kuo received his initial childhood education from his mother, which was a common practice in China during this period. (Note: See the article Society of the Song dynasty) She was very educated herself, teaching Kuo and his brother Pi (披) the military doctrines of her own elder brother Xu Dong (許洞; 975–1016). Since Shen was unable to boast of a prominent familial clan history like many of his elite peers born in the north, he was forced to rely on his wit and stern determination to achieve in his studies, subsequently passing the imperial examinations and enter the challenging and sophisticated life of an exam-drafted state bureaucrat.

From about 1040 AD, Shen's family moved around Sichuan province and finally to the international seaport at Xiamen, where Shen's father accepted minor provincial posts in each new location. Shen Zhou also served several years in the prestigious capital judiciary, the equivalent of a national supreme court. Shen Kuo took notice of the various towns and rural features of China as his family traveled, while he became interested during his youth in the diverse topography of the land. He also observed the intriguing aspects of his father's engagement in administrative governance and the managerial problems involved; these experiences had a deep impact on him as he later became a government official. Since he often became ill as a child, Shen Kuo also developed a natural curiosity about medicine and pharmaceutics.

Shen Zhou died in the late winter of 1051 (or early 1052), when his son Shen Kuo was 21 years old. Shen Kuo grieved for his father, and following Confucian ethics, remained inactive in a state of mourning for three years until 1054 (or early 1055). As of 1054, Shen began serving in minor local governmental posts. However, his natural abilities to plan, organize, and design were proven early in life; one example is his design and supervision of the hydraulic drainage of an embankment system, which converted some one hundred thousand acres (400 km^{2}) of swampland into prime farmland. Shen Kuo noted that the success of the silt fertilization method relied upon the effective operation of sluice gates of irrigation canals.

=== Official career ===
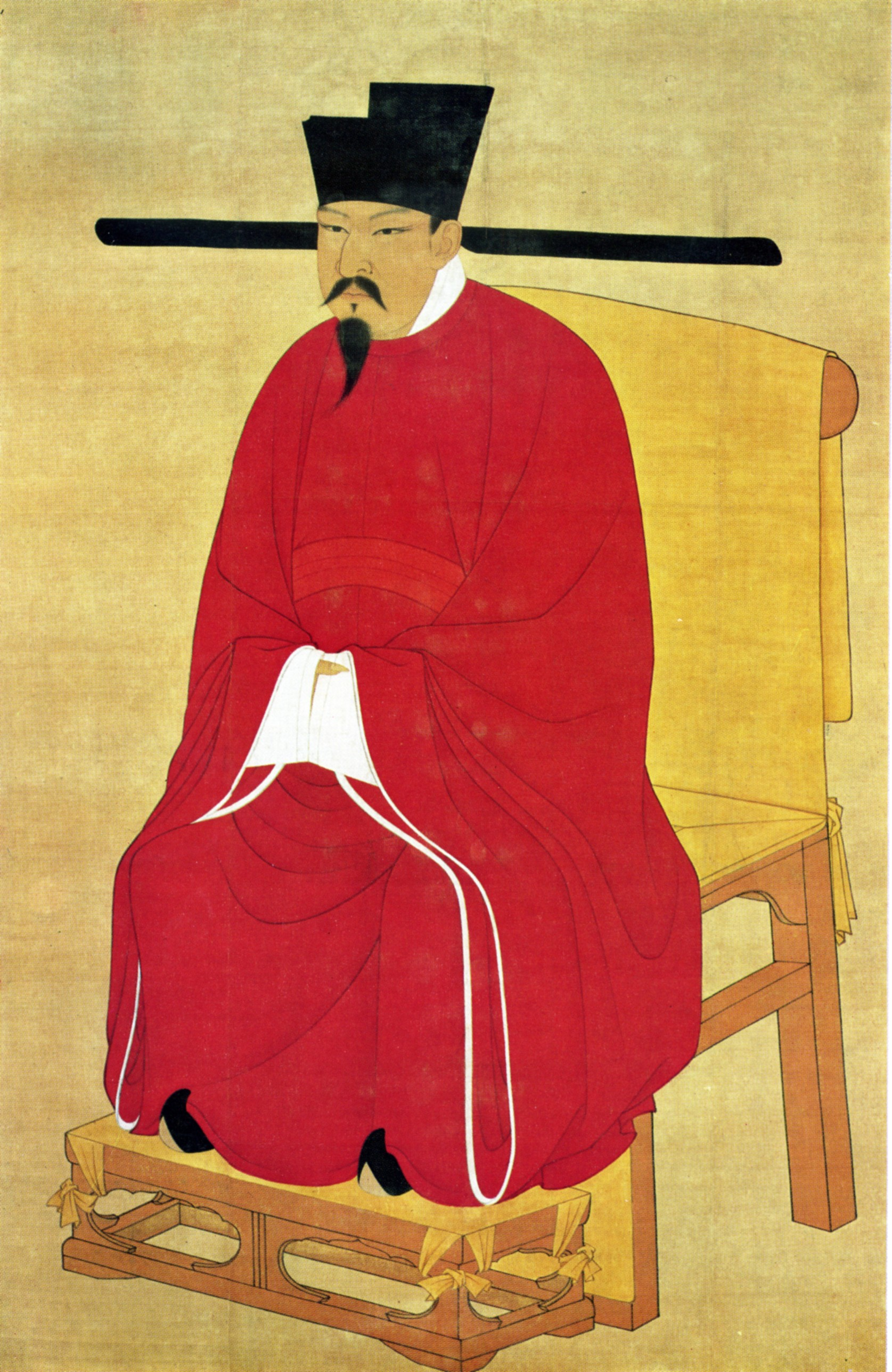
Shen's confidant, Emperor Shenzong of Song (r. 1067–1085), a Song-era portrait painting

In 1063 Shen Kuo successfully passed the imperial examinations, the difficult national-level standard test that every high official was required to pass in order to enter the governmental system. He not only passed the exam however, but was placed into the higher category of the best and brightest students. While serving at Yangzhou, Shen's brilliance and dutiful character caught the attention of Zhang Chu (張蒭; 1015–1080), the Fiscal Intendant of the region. Shen made a lasting impression upon Zhang, who recommended Shen for a court appointment in the financial administration of the central court. Shen would also eventually marry Zhang's daughter, who became his second wife.

In his career as a scholar-official for the central government, Shen Kuo was also an ambassador to the Western Xia dynasty and Liao dynasty, a military commander, a director of hydraulic works, and the leading chancellor of the Hanlin Academy. By 1072, Shen was appointed as the head official of the Bureau of Astronomy. With his leadership position in the bureau, Shen was responsible for projects in improving calendrical science, and proposed many reforms to the Chinese calendar alongside the work of his colleague Wei Pu. With his impressive skills and aptitude for matters of economy and finance, Shen was appointed as the Finance Commissioner at the central court.

As written by Li Zhiyi, a man married to Hu Wenrou (granddaughter of Hu Su, a famous minister of the Song dynasty), Shen Kuo was Li's mentor while Shen served as an official. According to Li's epitaph for his wife, Shen would sometimes relay questions via Li to Hu when he needed clarification for his mathematical work, as Hu Wenrou was esteemed by Shen as a remarkable female mathematician. Shen lamented: "If only she were a man, Wenrou would be my friend."

While employed by the central government, Shen Kuo was also sent out with others to inspect the granary system of the empire, investigating problems of illegal tax-collection, negligence, ineffective disaster relief, and inadequate water-conservancy projects. While Shen was appointed as the regional inspector of Zhejiang in 1073, the Emperor requested that Shen pay a visit to the famous poet Su Shi (1037–1101), then an administrator in Hangzhou. Shen took advantage of this meeting to copy some of Su's poetry, which he presented to the Emperor indicating that it expressed "abusive and hateful" speech against the Song court; these poems were later politicized by Li Ding and Shu Dan in order to level a court case against Su. (The Crow Terrace Poetry Trial of 1079.) With his demonstrations of loyalty and ability, Shen Kuo was awarded the honorary title of a State Foundation Viscount by Emperor Shenzong of Song (r. 1067–1085), who placed a great amount of trust in Shen Kuo. He was even made 'companion to the heir apparent' (太子中允; 'Taizi zhongyun').

Portrait painting of Wang Anshi

At court Shen was a political favorite of the Chancellor Wang Anshi (1021–1086), who was the leader of the political faction of Reformers, also known as the New Policies Group (新法, Xin Fa). (Note: Refer to the Partisans and factions, reformers and conservatives section of the article History of the Song dynasty.) Shen Kuo had a previous history with Wang Anshi, since it was Wang who had composed the funerary epitaph for Shen's father, Zhou. Shen Kuo soon impressed Wang Anshi with his skills and abilities as an administrator and government agent. In 1072, Shen was sent to supervise Wang's program of surveying the building of silt deposits in the Bian Canal outside the capital city. Using an original technique, Shen successfully dredged the canal and demonstrated the formidable value of the silt gathered as a fertilizer. He gained further reputation at court once he was dispatched as an envoy to the Khitan Liao dynasty in the summer of 1075. The Khitans had made several aggressive negotiations of pushing their borders south, while manipulating several incompetent Song ambassadors who conceded to the Liao Kingdom's demands. In a brilliant display of diplomacy, Shen Kuo came to the camp of the Khitan monarch at Mt. Yongan (near modern Pingquan, Hebei), armed with copies of previously archived diplomatic negotiations between the Song and Liao dynasties. Shen Kuo refuted Emperor Daozong's bluffs point for point, while the Song reestablished their rightful border line. In regard to the Lý dynasty of Đại Việt (in modern northern Vietnam), Shen demonstrated in his Dream Pool Essays that he was familiar with the key players (on the Vietnamese side) in the prelude to the Sino-Vietnamese War of 1075–1077. With his reputable achievements, Shen became a trusted member of Wang Anshi's elite circle of eighteen unofficial core political loyalists to the New Policies Group.

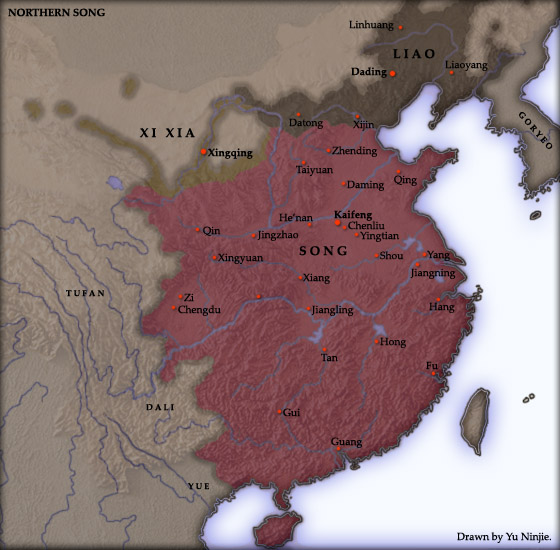
Boundaries of the Northern Song dynasty, the Liao dynasty, and the Western Xia

Although much of Wang Anshi's reforms outlined in the New Policies centered on state finance, land tax reform, and the Imperial examinations, there were also military concerns. This included policies of raising militias to lessen the expense of upholding a million soldiers, putting government monopolies on saltpetre and sulphur production and distribution in 1076 (to ensure that gunpowder solutions would not fall into the hands of enemies), and aggressive military policy towards Song's northern rivals of the Western Xia and Liao dynasties. A few years after Song dynasty military forces had made victorious territorial gains against the Tanguts of the Western Xia, in 1080 Shen Kuo was entrusted as a military officer in defense of Yanzhou (modern-day Yan'an, Shaanxi province). During the autumn months of 1081, Shen was successful in defending Song dynasty territory while capturing several fortified towns of the Western Xia. The Emperor Shenzong of Song rewarded Shen with numerous titles for his merit in these battles, and in the sixteen months of Shen's military campaign, he received 273 letters from the Emperor. However, Emperor Shenzong trusted an arrogant military officer who disobeyed the emperor and Shen's proposal for strategic fortifications, instead fortifying what Shen considered useless strategic locations. Furthermore, this officer expelled Shen from his commanding post at the main citadel, so as to deny him any glory in chance of victory. The result of this was nearly catastrophic, as the forces of the arrogant officer were decimated; Xinzhong Yao states that the death toll was 60,000. Nonetheless, Shen was successful in defending his fortifications and the only possible Tangut invasion-route to Yanzhou.

=== Impeachment and later life ===
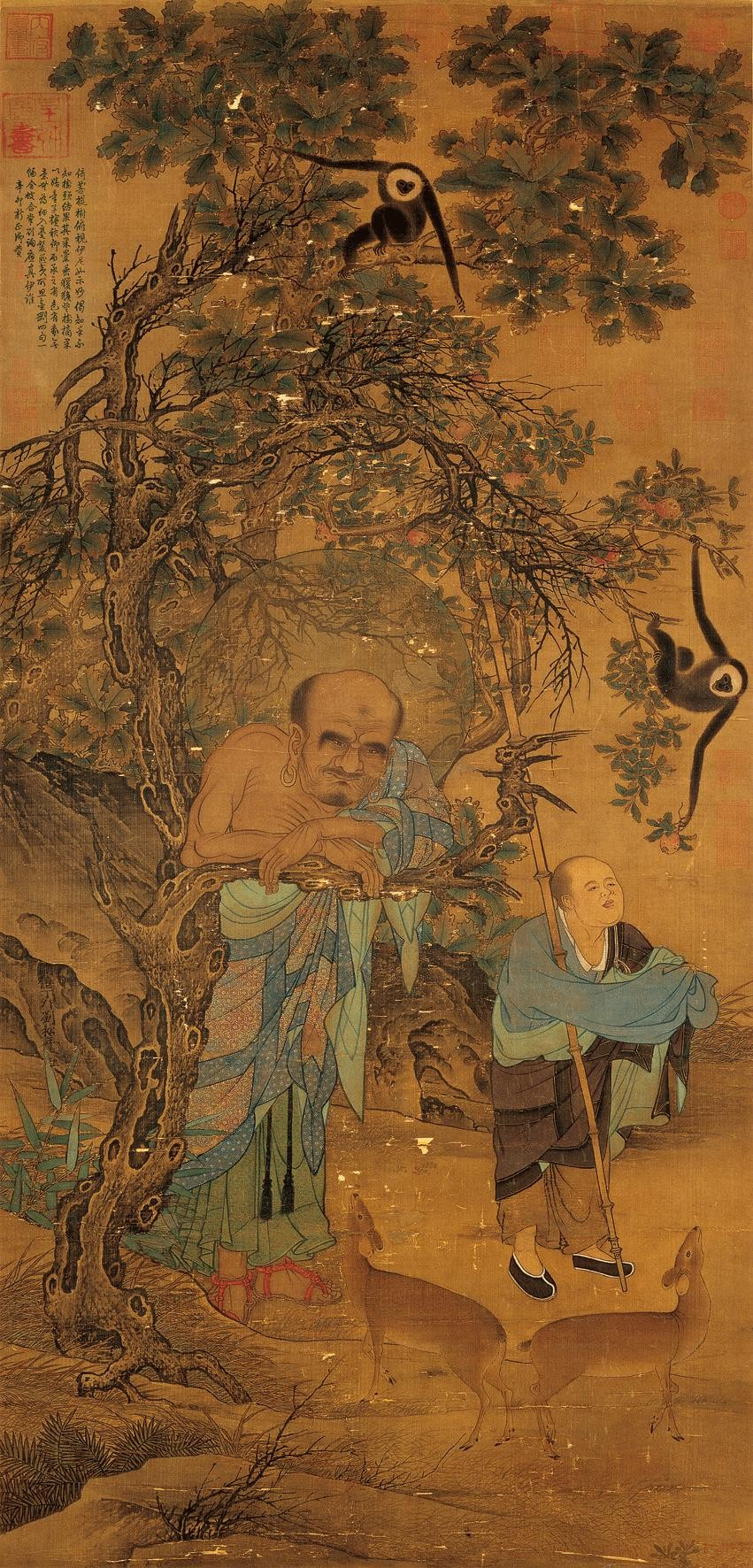
Painting of a Buddhist luohan, by Liu Songnian, painted in 1207; Shen Kuo not only listed literati painting as one of his cherished pastimes, but also Buddhist meditation.

The new Chancellor Cai Que (蔡確; 1036–1093) held Shen responsible for the disaster and loss of life. Along with abandoning the territory which Shen Kuo had fought for, Cai ousted Shen from his seat of office. Shen's life was now forever changed, as he lost his once reputable career in state governance and the military. Shen was then put under probation in a fixed residence for the next six years. However, as he was isolated from governance, he decided to pick up the ink brush and dedicate himself to intensive scholarly studies. After completing two geographical atlases for a state-sponsored program, Shen was rewarded by having his sentence of probation lifted, allowing him to live in a place of his choice. Shen was also pardoned by the court for any previous faults or crimes that were claimed against him.

In his more idle years removed from court affairs, Shen Kuo enjoyed pastimes of the Chinese gentry and literati that would indicate his intellectual level and cultural taste to others. As described in his Dream Pool Essays, Shen Kuo enjoyed the company of the "nine guests" (九客, jiuke), a figure of speech for the Chinese zither, the older 17x17 line variant of weiqi (known today as go), Buddhist meditation, ink (calligraphy and painting), tea drinking, alchemy, chanting poetry, conversation, and drinking wine. These nine activities were an extension to the older so-called Four Arts of the Chinese Scholar.

In the 1070s, Shen had purchased a lavish garden estate on the outskirts of modern-day Zhenjiang, Jiangsu province, a place of great beauty which he named "Dream Brook" ("Mengxi") after he visited it for the first time in 1086. Shen Kuo permanently moved to the Dream Brook Estate in 1088, and in that same year he completed his life's written work of the Dream Pool Essays, naming the book after his garden-estate property. It was there that Shen Kuo spent the last several years of his life in leisure, isolation, and illness, until his death in 1095.

== Scholarly achievements ==
Shen Kuo wrote extensively on a wide range of different subjects. His written work included two geographical atlases, a treatise on music with mathematical harmonics, governmental administration, mathematical astronomy, astronomical instruments, martial defensive tactics and fortifications, painting, tea, medicine, and much poetry. His scientific writings have been praised by sinologists such as Joseph Needham and Nathan Sivin, and he has been compared by Sivin to polymaths such as his Song dynasty Chinese contemporary Su Song, as well as to Gottfried Leibniz and Mikhail Lomonosov.

=== Raised-relief map ===
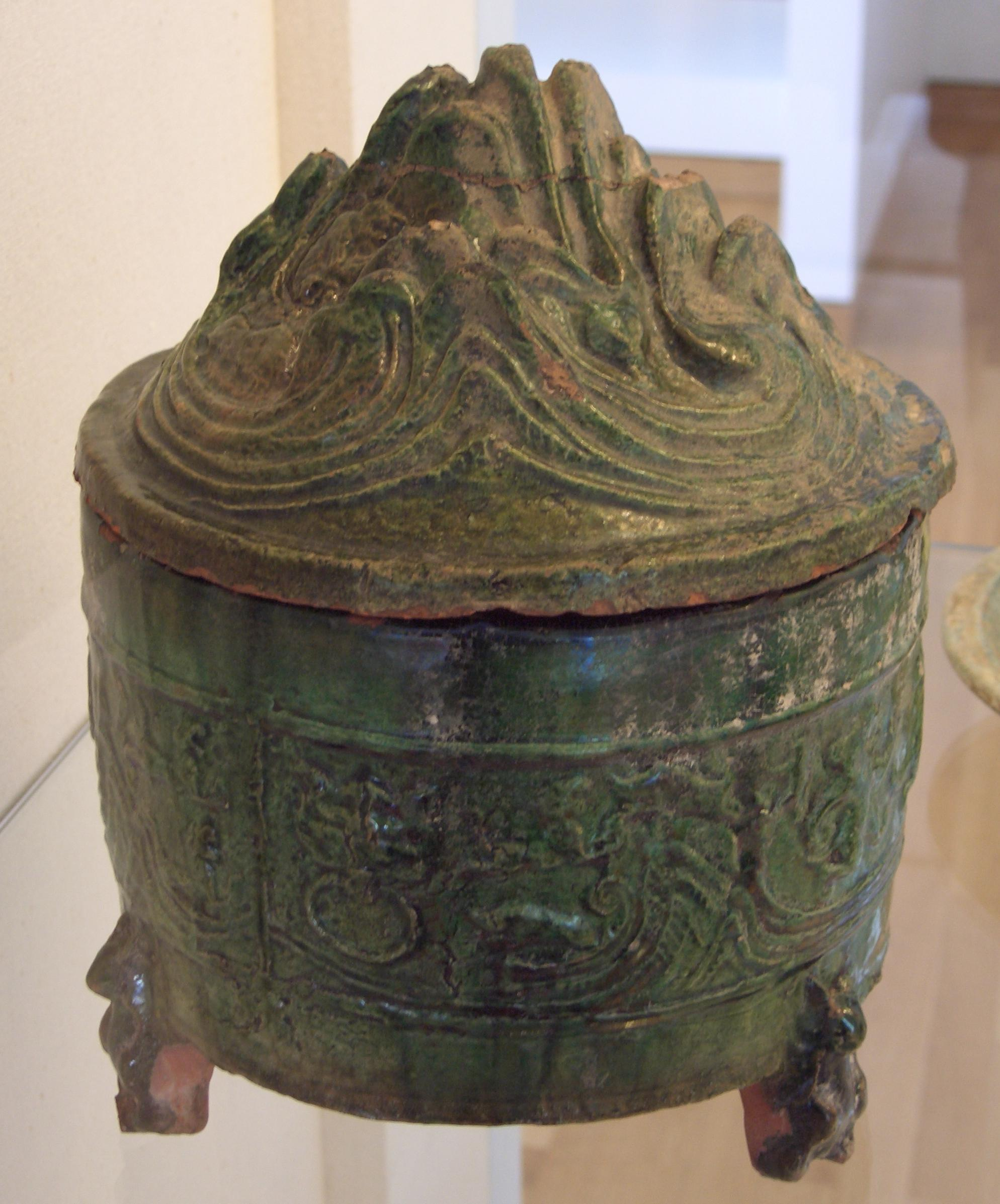
A Han dynasty incense burner, showing artificial mountains as a lid decoration, which may have influenced the invention

Joseph Needham suggests that certain pottery vessels of the Han dynasty (202 BC – 220 AD) showing artificial mountains as lid decorations may have influenced the development of the raised-relief map in China. The Han dynasty general Ma Yuan (14 BC – 49 AD) is recorded as having made a raised-relief map of valleys and mountains in a rice-constructed model of 32 AD. Shen Kuo's largest atlas included twenty three maps of China and foreign regions that were drawn at a uniform scale of 1:900,000. Shen also created a raised-relief map using sawdust, wood, beeswax, and wheat paste. Zhu Xi (1130–1200) was inspired by the raised-relief map of Huang Shang and so made his own portable map made of wood and clay which could be folded up from eight hinged pieces.

=== Pharmacology ===
For pharmacology, Shen wrote of the difficulties of adequate diagnosis and therapy, as well as the proper selection, preparation, and administration of drugs. He held great concern for detail and philological accuracy in identification, use and cultivation of different types of medicinal herbs, such as in which months medicinal plants should be gathered, their exact ripening times, which parts should be used for therapy; for domesticated herbs he wrote about planting times, fertilization, and other matters of horticulture. In the realms of botany, zoology, and mineralogy, Shen Kuo documented and systematically described hundreds of different plants, agricultural crops, rare vegetation, animals, and minerals found in China. For example, Shen noted that the mineral orpiment was used to quickly erase writing errors on paper.

=== Civil engineering ===
A side view of a pound lock for canals, invented in China in the 10th century and described by Shen

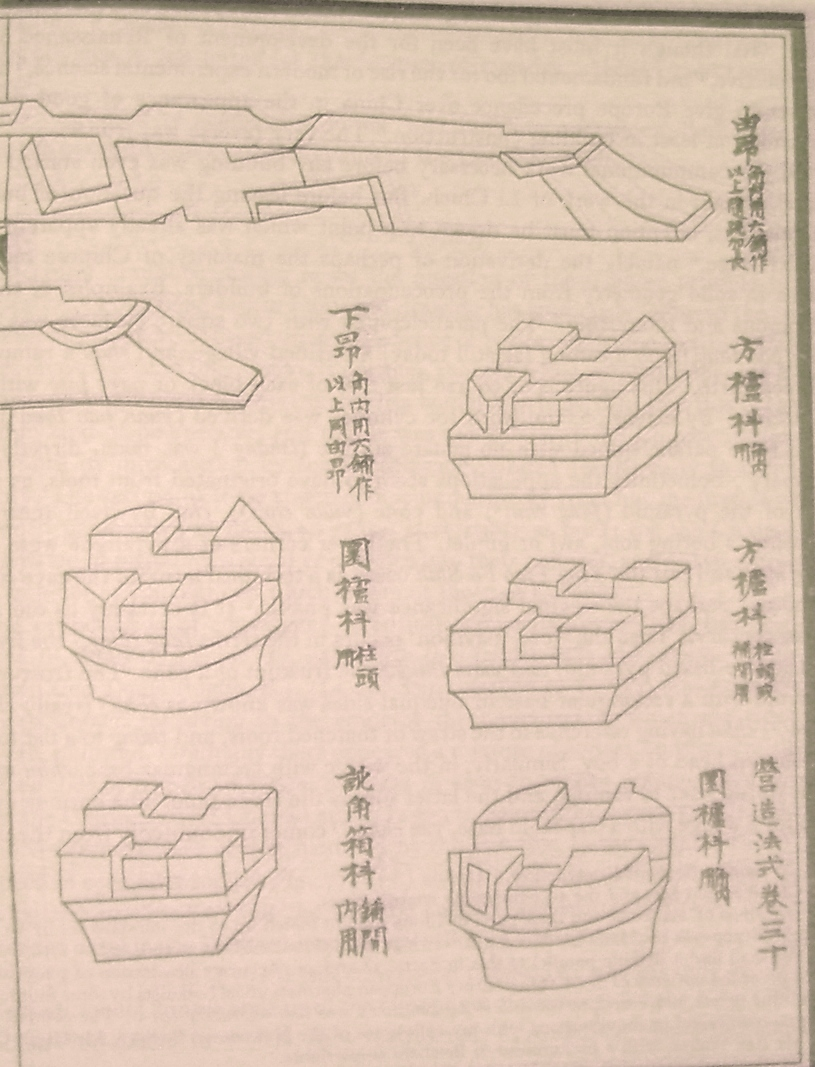
Five bracket arm bases and two cantilever arms, from the Yingzao Fashi of 1103

The writing of Shen Kuo is the only source for the date when the drydock was first used in China. Shen Kuo wrote that during the Xi-Ning reign (1068–1077), the court official Huang Huaixin devised a plan for repairing 60 m (200 ft) long palatial boats that were a century old; essentially, Huang Huaixin devised the first Chinese drydock for suspending boats out of water. These boats were then placed in a roof-covered dock warehouse to protect them from weathering. Shen also wrote about the effectiveness of the new invention (i.e. by the 10th century engineer Qiao Weiyue) of the pound lock to replace the old flash lock design used in canals. He wrote that it saved the work of five hundred annual labors, annual costs of up to 1,250,000 strings of cash, and increased the size limit of boats accommodated from 21 tons/21000 kg to 113 tons/115000 kg.

If it were not for Shen Kuo's analysis and quoting in his Dream Pool Essays of the writings of the architect Yu Hao (fl. 970), the latter's work would have been lost to history. (Note: For more, see Architecture of the Song dynasty) Yu designed a famous wooden pagoda that burned down in 1044 and was replaced in 1049 by a brick pagoda (the 'Iron Pagoda') of similar height, but not of his design. From Shen's quotation—or perhaps Shen's own paraphrasing of Yu Hao's Timberwork Manual (木經; Mujing)—shows that already in the 10th century there was a graded system of building unit proportions, a system which Shen states had become more precise in his time but stating no one could possibly reproduce such a sound work. However, he did not anticipate the more complex and matured system of unit proportions embodied in the extensive written work by scholar-official Li Jie (1065–1110), the Treatise on Architectural Methods (營造法式; Yingzao Fashi) of 1103. Klaas Ruitenbeek states that the version of the Timberwork Manual quoted by Shen is most likely Shen's summarization of Yu's work or a corrupted passage of the original by Yu Hao, as Shen writes: "According to some, the work was written by Yu Hao."

=== Anatomy ===
The Chinese had long taken an interest in examining the human body. For example, in 16 AD, the Xin dynasty usurper Wang Mang called for the dissection of an executed man, to examine his arteries and viscera in order to discover cures for illnesses. Shen also took interest in human anatomy, dispelling the long-held Chinese theory that the throat contained three valves, writing, "When liquid and solid are imbibed together, how can it be that in one's mouth they sort themselves into two throat channels?" Shen maintained that the larynx was the beginning of a system that distributed vital qi from the air throughout the body, and that the esophagus was a simple tube that dropped food into the stomach. Following Shen's reasoning and correcting the findings of the dissection of executed bandits in 1045, an early 12th-century Chinese account of a bodily dissection finally supported Shen's belief in two throat valves, not three. Also, the later Song dynasty judge and early forensic expert Song Ci (1186–1249) would promote the use of autopsy in order to solve homicide cases, as written in his Collected Cases of Injustice Rectified.

=== Mathematics ===
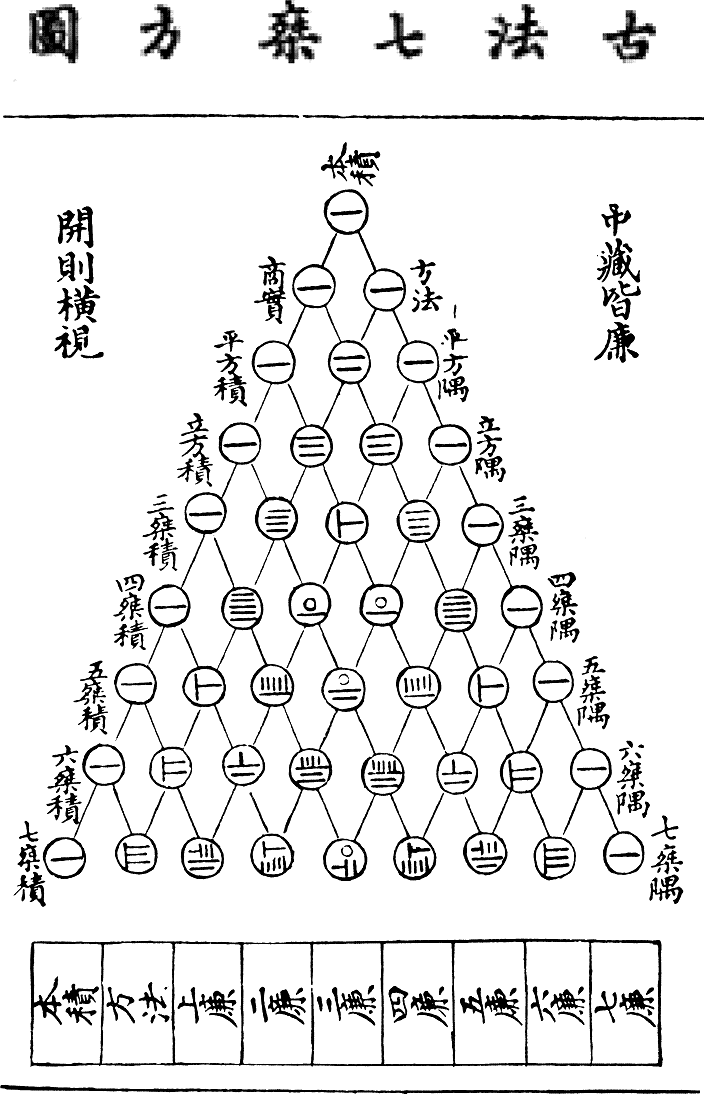
Yang Hui triangle (Pascal's triangle) using rod numerals, from a book by mathematician Zhu Shijie, 1303

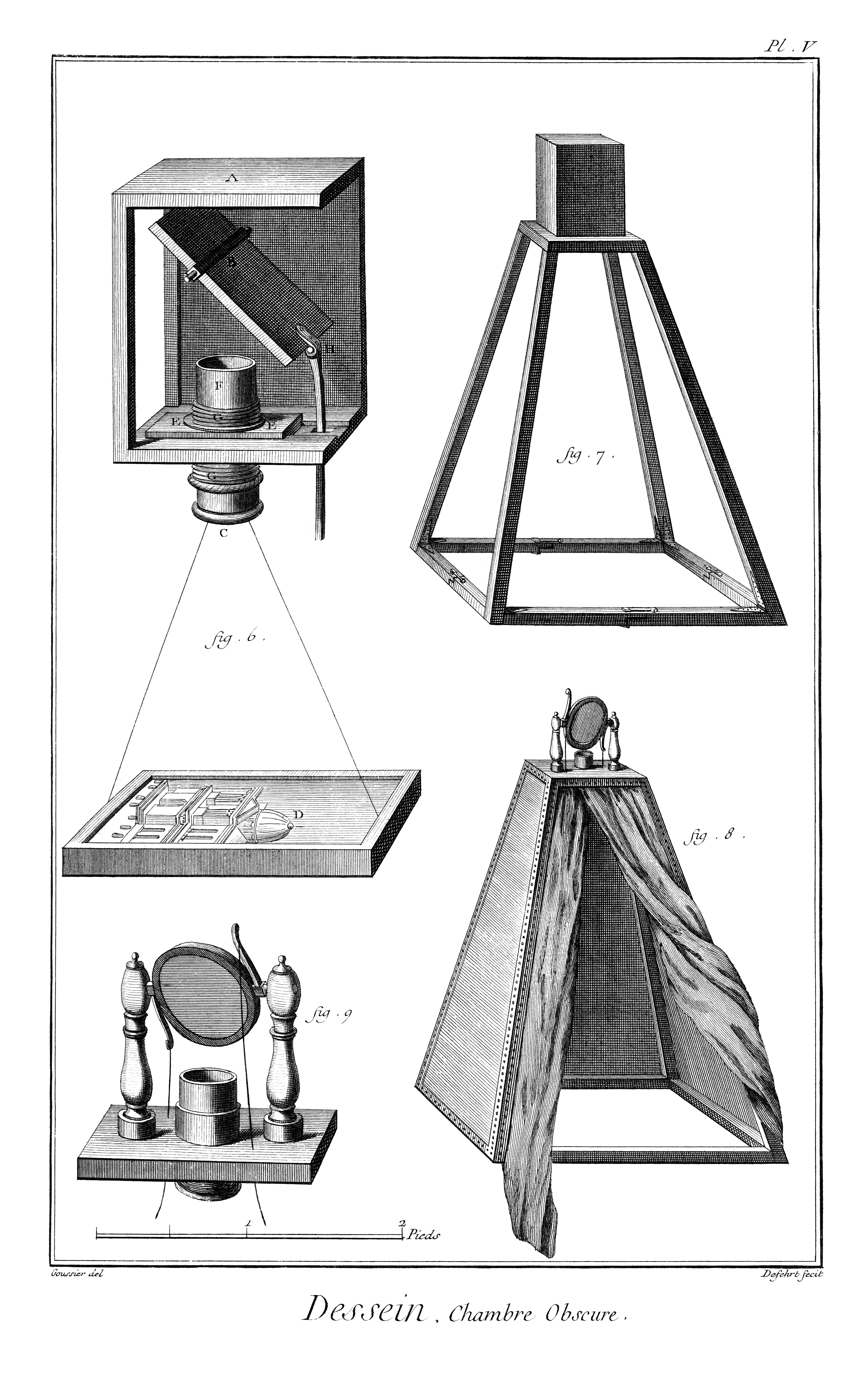
An 18th-century diagram of camera obscura

In the broad field of mathematics, Shen Kuo mastered many practical mathematical problems, including many complex formulas for geometry, circle packing, and chords and arcs problems employing trigonometry. Shen addressed problems of writing out very large numbers, as large as (10^{4})^{43}. Shen's "technique of small increments" laid the foundation in Chinese mathematics for packing problems involving equal difference series. Sal Restivo writes that Shen used summation of higher series to ascertain the number of kegs which could be piled in layers in a space shaped like the frustum of a rectangular pyramid. In his formula "technique of intersecting circles", he created an approximation of the arc of a circle s given the diameter d, sagitta v, and length of the chord c subtending the arc, the length of which he approximated as s = c + 2v^{2}/d. Restivo writes that Shen's work in the lengths of arcs of circles provided the basis for spherical trigonometry developed in the 13th century by Guo Shoujing (1231–1316). He also simplified the counting rods technique by outlining short cuts in algorithm procedures used on the counting board, an idea expanded on by the mathematician Yang Hui (1238–1298). Victor J. Katz asserts that Shen's method of "dividing by 9, increase by 1; dividing by 8, increase by 2," was a direct forerunner to the rhyme scheme method of repeated addition "9, 1, bottom add 1; 9, 2, bottom add 2".

Shen wrote extensively about what he had learned while working for the state treasury, including mathematical problems posed by computing land tax, estimating requirements, currency issues, metrology, and so forth. Shen once computed the amount of terrain space required for battle formations in military strategy, and also computed the longest possible military campaign given the limits of human carriers who would bring their own food and food for other soldiers. Shen wrote about the earlier Yi Xing (672–717), a Buddhist monk who applied an early escapement mechanism to a water-powered celestial globe. By using mathematical permutations, Shen described Yi Xing's calculation of possible positions on a go board game. Shen calculated the total number for this using up to five rows and twenty five game pieces, which yielded the number 847,288,609,443.

=== Optics ===
Shen Kuo experimented with the pinhole camera and burning mirror as the ancient Chinese Mohists had done in the 4th century BC, as Mozi of China's Warring States period was perhaps the first to describe the concept of camera obscura, if not his Greek contemporary Aristotle. The Iraqi Muslim scientist Ibn al-Haytham (965–1039) further experimented with camera obscura and was the first to attribute geometrical and quantitative properties to it, but Shen was first to note the relationship of the three separate radiation phenomena: the focal point, burning point, and pinhole. Using a fitting metaphor, Shen compared optical image inversion to an oarlock and waisted drum. Along with focal points, he also noted that the image in a concave mirror is inverted. Shen, who never asserted that he was the first to experiment with camera obscura, hints in his writing that camera obscura was dealt with in the Miscellaneous Morsels from Youyang written by Duan Chengshi (d. 863) during the Tang dynasty (618–907), in regard to the inverted image of a Chinese pagoda by a seashore. Chinese authors from the 12th to 17th centuries would discuss the optical observations made by Shen Kuo but not advance them further, while Leonardo da Vinci (1452–1519) would be the first in Europe to make a similar observation about the focal point and pinhole in camera obscura.

=== Magnetic needle compass ===
Since the time of the engineer and inventor Ma Jun (c. 200–265), the Chinese had used the south-pointing chariot, which did not employ magnetism, as a compass. In 1044 the Collection of the Most Important Military Techniques (武經總要; Wujing Zongyao) recorded that fish-shaped objects cut from sheet iron, magnetized by thermoremanence (essentially, heating that produced weak magnetic force), and placed in a water-filled bowl enclosed by a box were used for directional pathfinding alongside the south-pointing chariot.

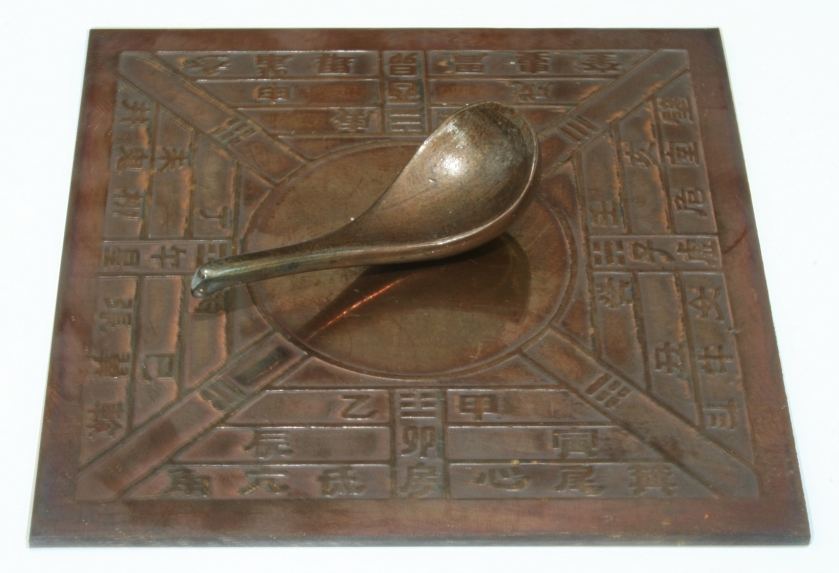
A Han dynasty (202 BC–220 AD) ladle-and-basin lodestone south-pointing compass, used by ancient Chinese geomancers, but not for navigation

However, it was not until the time of Shen Kuo that the earliest magnetic compasses would be used for navigation. In his written work, Shen Kuo made the first known explicit reference to the magnetic compass-needle and the concept of true north. He wrote that steel needles were magnetized once they were rubbed with lodestone, and that they were put in floating position or in mountings; he described the suspended compass as the best form to be used, and noted that the magnetic needle of compasses pointed either south or north. Shen Kuo asserted that the needle will point south but with a deviation, stating "[the magnetic needles] are always displaced slightly east rather than pointing due south."

Shen Kuo wrote that it was preferable to use the twenty-four-point rose instead of the old eight compass cardinal points — and the former was recorded in use for navigation shortly after Shen's death. The preference of use for the twenty-four-point-rose compass may have arisen from Shen's finding of a more accurate astronomical meridian, determined by his measurement between the pole star and true north; however, it could also have been inspired by geomantic beliefs and practices. The book of the author Zhu Yu, the Pingzhou Table Talks published in 1119 (written from 1111 to 1117), was the first record of use of a compass for seafaring navigation. However, Zhu Yu's book recounts events back to 1086, when Shen Kuo was writing the Dream Pool Essays; this meant that in Shen's time the compass might have already been in navigational use. In any case, Shen Kuo's writing on magnetic compasses has proved invaluable for understanding China's earliest use of the compass for seafaring navigation.

=== Archaeology ===
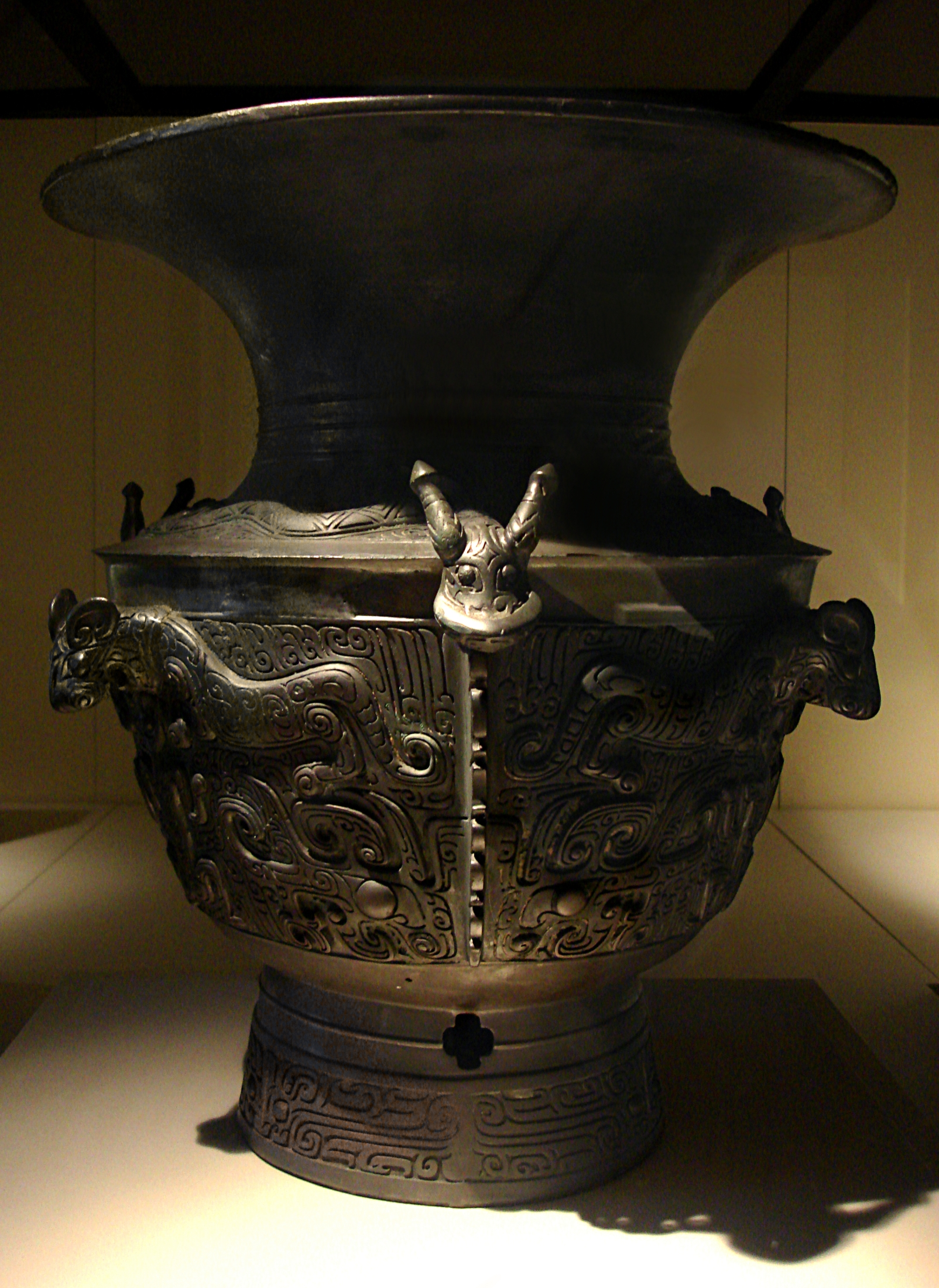
Bronzeware from the Shang dynasty (1600–1046 BC); Song era antiquarians and archeologists in search of antiques for reviving ancient rituals claimed to have found bronzewares dated as far back as the Shang era, which contained written inscriptions.

Many of Shen Kuo's contemporaries were interested in antiquarian pursuits of collecting old artworks. They were also interested in archaeological pursuits, although for rather different reasons than why Shen Kuo held an interest in archaeology. While Shen's educated Confucian contemporaries were interested in obtaining ancient relics and antiques in order to revive their use in rituals, Shen was more concerned with how items from archeological finds were originally manufactured and what their functionality would have been, based on empirical evidence. Shen Kuo criticized those in his day who reconstructed ancient ritual objects using only their imagination and not the tangible evidence from archeological digs or finds. Shen also disdained the notion of others that these objects were products of the "sages" or the aristocratic class of antiquity, rightfully crediting the items' manufacture and production to the common working people and artisans of previous eras. Some author writes that Shen Kuo "advocated the use of an interdisciplinary approach to archaeology and practiced such an approach himself through his work in metallurgy, optics, and geometry in the study of ancient measures."

While working in the Bureau of Astronomy, Shen Kuo's interest in archaeology and old relics led him to reconstruct an armillary sphere from existing models as well as from ancient texts that could provide additional information. Shen used ancient mirrors while conducting his optics experiments. He observed ancient weaponry, describing the scaled sight devices on ancient crossbows and the ancients' production of swords with composite blades that had a midrib of wrought iron and low-carbon steel while having two sharp edges of high-carbon steel. Being a knowledgeable musician, Shen also suggested suspending an ancient bell by using a hollow handle. In his assessment of the carved reliefs of the ancient Zhuwei Tomb, Shen stated that the reliefs demonstrate genuine Han dynasty era clothing.

After unearthing an ancient crossbow device from a house's garden in Haichow, Jiangsu, Shen discovered that the cross-wire grid sighting device, marked in graduated measurements on the stock, could be used to calculate the height of a distant mountain in the same way that mathematicians could apply right-angle triangles to measure height. Needham asserts Shen had discovered the survey device known as Jacob's staff, which was not described elsewhere until the Provençal Jewish mathematician Levi ben Gerson (1288–1344) wrote of it in 1321. Shen wrote that while viewing the whole of a mountain, the distance on the instrument was long, but while viewing a small part of the mountainside the distance was short due to the device's cross piece that had to be pushed further away from the observer's eye, with the graduation starting on the further end. He wrote that if one placed an arrow on the device and looked past its end, the degree of the mountain could be measured and thus its height could be calculated.

=== Geology ===
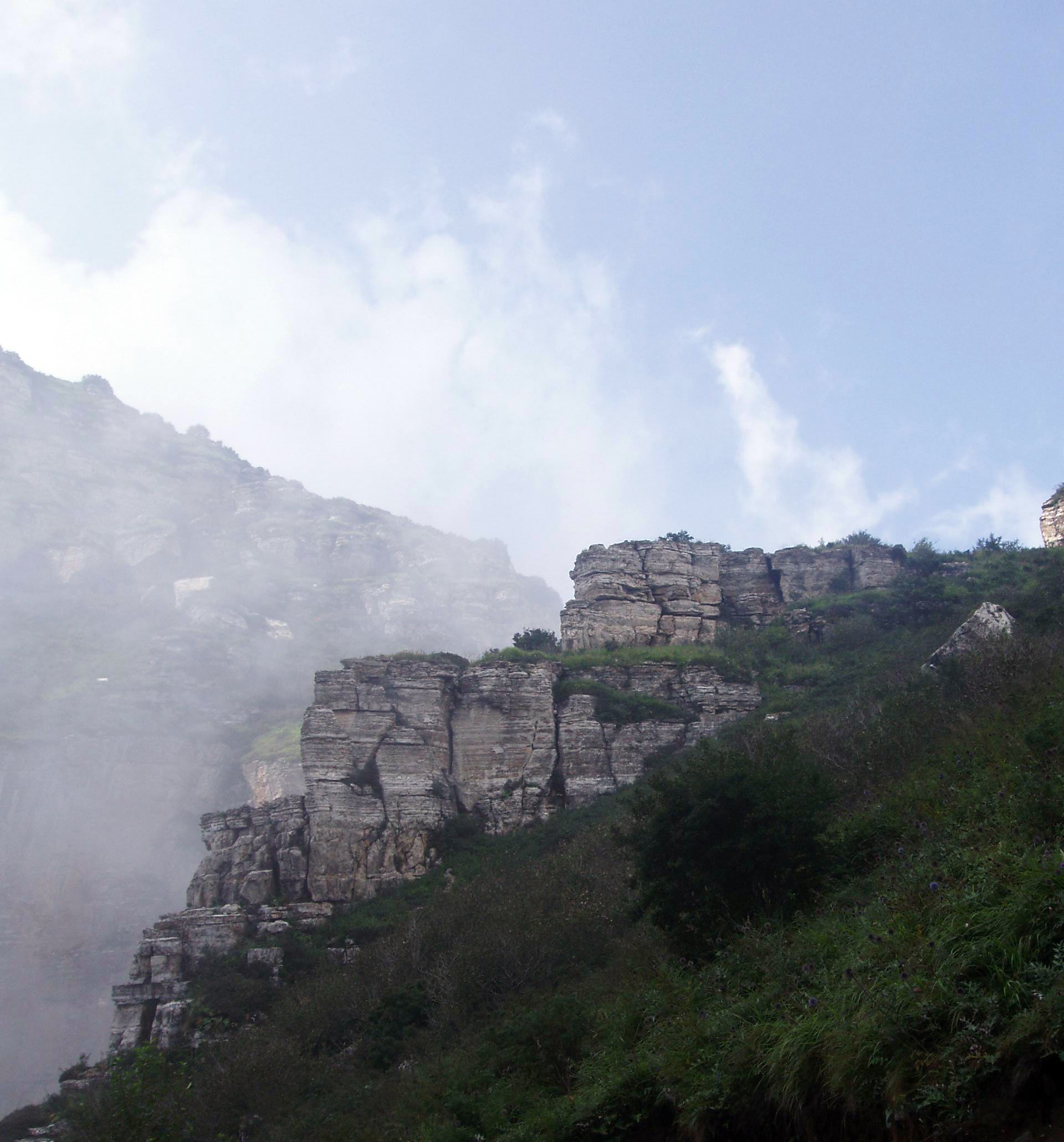
View of the Taihang Mountains, where Shen Kuo had his epiphany about geomorphology

The ancient Greek Aristotle (384 BC–322 BC) wrote in his Meteorology of how the earth had the potential for physical change, including the belief that all rivers and seas at one time did not exist where they were, and were dry. The Greek writer Xenophanes (570 BC–480 BC) wrote of how inland marine fossils were evidence that massive periodic flooding had wiped out mankind several times in the past, but never wrote of land formation or shifting seashores. Du Yu (222–285) a Chinese Jin dynasty officer, believed that the land of hills would eventually be leveled into valleys and valleys would gradually rise to form hills. The Daoist alchemist Ge Hong (284–364) wrote of the legendary immortal Magu; in a written dialogue by Ge, Ma Gu described how what was once the Eastern Sea (i.e. East China Sea) had transformed into solid land where mulberry trees grew, and would one day be filled with mountains and dry, dusty lands. The later Persian Muslim scholar Abū Rayhān al-Bīrūnī (973–1048) hypothesized that India was once covered by the Indian Ocean while observing rock formations at the mouths of rivers.

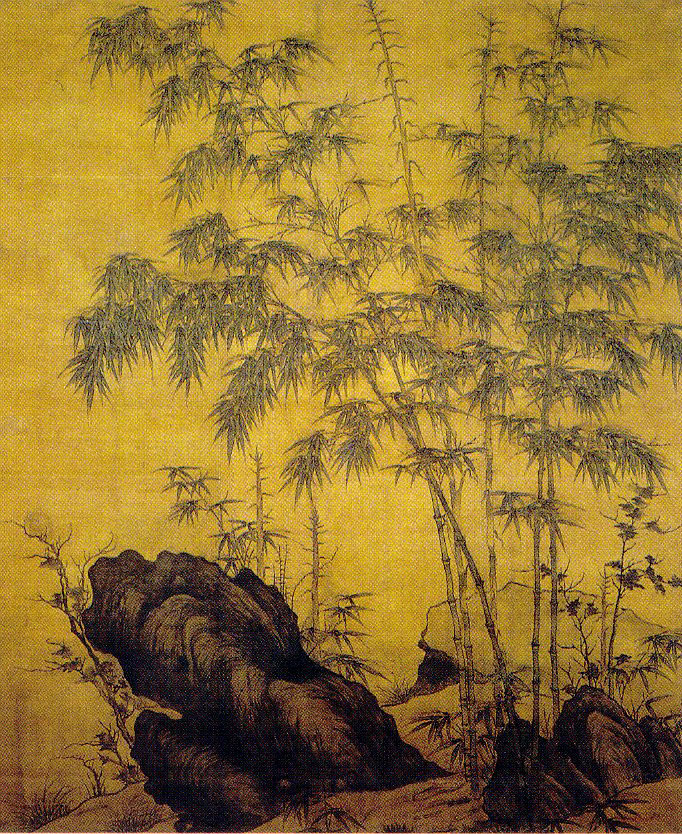
Bamboo and rocks by Li Kan (1244–1320); using evidence of fossilized bamboo within China's dry northwestern climate zone, Shen Kuo hypothesized that climates naturally shifted geographically over time.

It was Shen Kuo who formulated a hypothesis about the process of land formation (geomorphology) based upon several observations as evidence. This included his observation of fossil shells in a geological stratum of a mountain hundreds of miles from the ocean. He inferred that the land was reshaped and formed by erosion of the mountains, uplift, and the deposition of silt, after observing strange natural erosions of the Taihang Mountains and the Yandang Mountain near Wenzhou. He hypothesized that, with the inundation of silt, the land of the continent must have been formed over an enormous span of time. While visiting the Taihang Mountains in 1074, Shen Kuo noticed strata of bivalve shells and ovoid rocks in a horizontal-running span through a cliff like a large belt. Shen proposed that the cliff was once the location of an ancient seashore that by his time had shifted hundreds of miles east. Shen wrote that in the Zhiping reign period (1064–1067) a man of Zezhou unearthed an object in his garden that looked like a serpent or dragon, and after examining it, concluded the dead animal had apparently turned to "stone". The magistrate of Jincheng, Zheng Boshun, examined the creature as well, and noted the same scale-like markings that were seen on other marine animals. Shen Kuo likened this to the "stone crabs" found in China.

Shen also wrote that since petrified bamboos were found underground in a climatic area where they had never been known to be grown, the climate there must have shifted geographically over time. Around the year 1080, Shen Kuo noted that a landslide on the bank of a large river near Yanzhou (modern Yan'an) had revealed an open space several dozens of feet under the ground once the bank collapsed. This underground space contained hundreds of petrified bamboos still intact with roots and trunks, "all turned to stone" as Shen Kuo wrote. Shen Kuo noted that bamboos do not grow in Yanzhou, located in northern China, and he was puzzled during which previous dynasty the bamboos could have grown. Considering that damp and gloomy low places provide suitable conditions for the growth of bamboo, Shen deduced that the climate of Yanzhou must have fit that description in very ancient times. Although this would have intrigued many of his readers, the study of paleoclimatology in medieval China did not develop into an established discipline.

The Song dynasty philosopher Zhu Xi (1130–1200) wrote of this curious natural phenomenon of fossils as well. He was known to have read the works of Shen Kuo. Shen's description of soil erosion and weathering predated that of Georgius Agricola in his book of 1546, De veteribus et novis metallis. Furthermore, Shen's theory of sedimentary deposition predated that of James Hutton, whose groundbreaking work was published in 1802 (considered the foundation of modern geology). Historian Joseph Needham likened Shen's account to that of the Scottish scientist Roderick Murchison (1792–1871), who was inspired to become a geologist after observing a providential landslide.

=== Meteorology ===
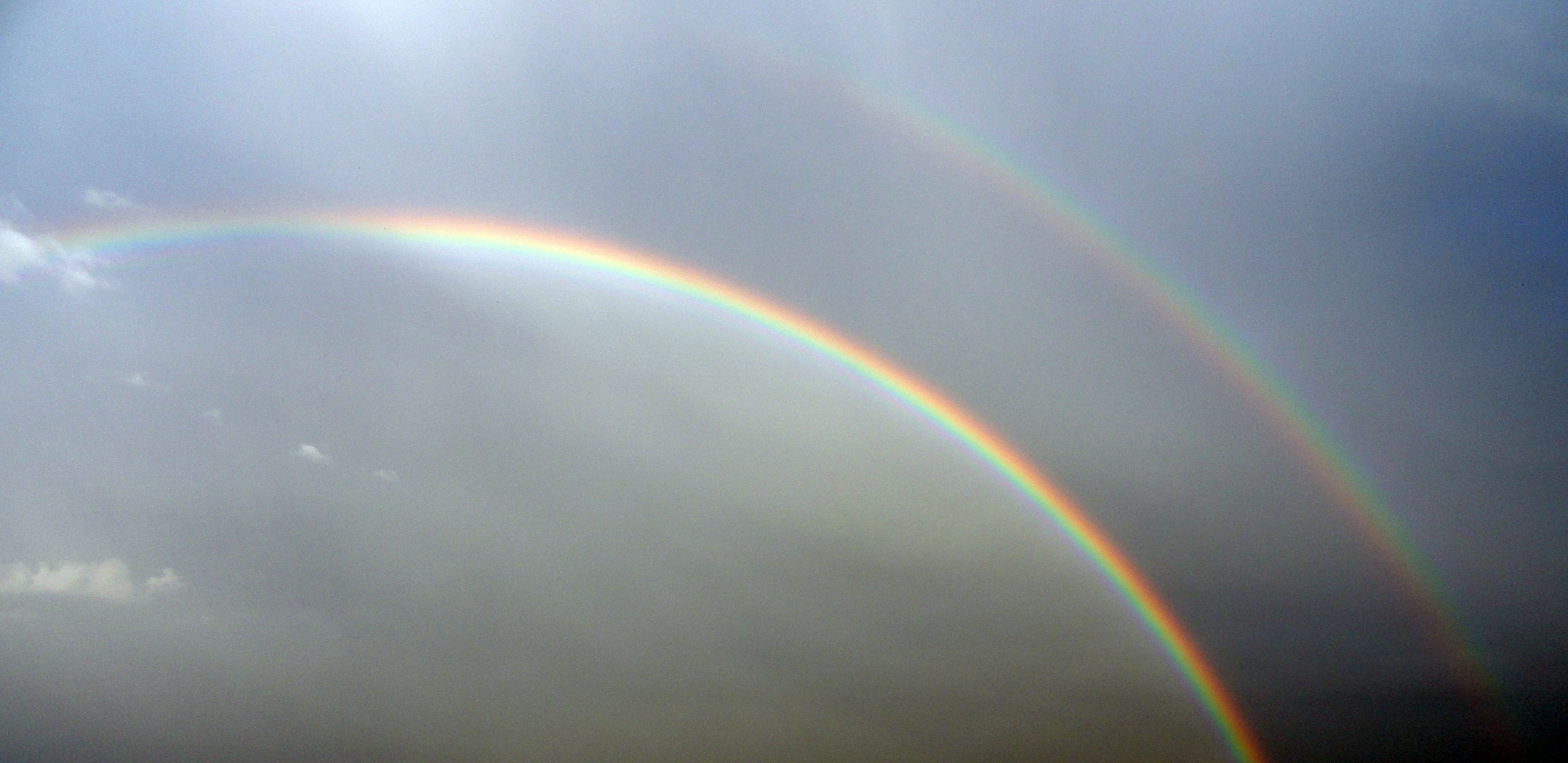
Shen accurately hypothesized that rainbows were caused by sunlight passing through rain droplets.

Early speculation and hypothesis pertaining to what is now known as meteorology had a long tradition in China before Shen Kuo. For example, the Han dynasty scholar Wang Chong (27–97) accurately described the process of the water cycle. However, Shen made some observations that were not found elsewhere in Chinese literature. For instance, Shen was the first in East Asia to describe tornadoes, which were thought to exist only in the Western Hemisphere until their observation in China during the first decade of the 20th century.

Shen gave reasoning (earlier proposed by Sun Sikong, 1015–1076) that rainbows were formed by the shadow of the sun in rain, occurring when the sun would shine upon it. Paul Dong writes that Shen's explanation of the rainbow as a phenomenon of atmospheric refraction "is basically in accord with modern scientific principles." In Europe, Roger Bacon (1214–1294) was the first to suggest that the colors of the rainbow were caused by the reflection and refraction of sunlight through rain drops.

Shen hypothesized that rays of sunlight refract before reaching the surface of the Earth, hence people on Earth observing the Sun are not viewing it in its exact position, in other words, the altitude of the apparent Sun is higher than the actual altitude of the Sun. Dong writes that "at the time, this discovery was remarkably original." Ibn al-Haytham, in his Book of Optics (1021), also discussed atmospheric refraction in regard to twilight.

=== Astronomy and instruments ===
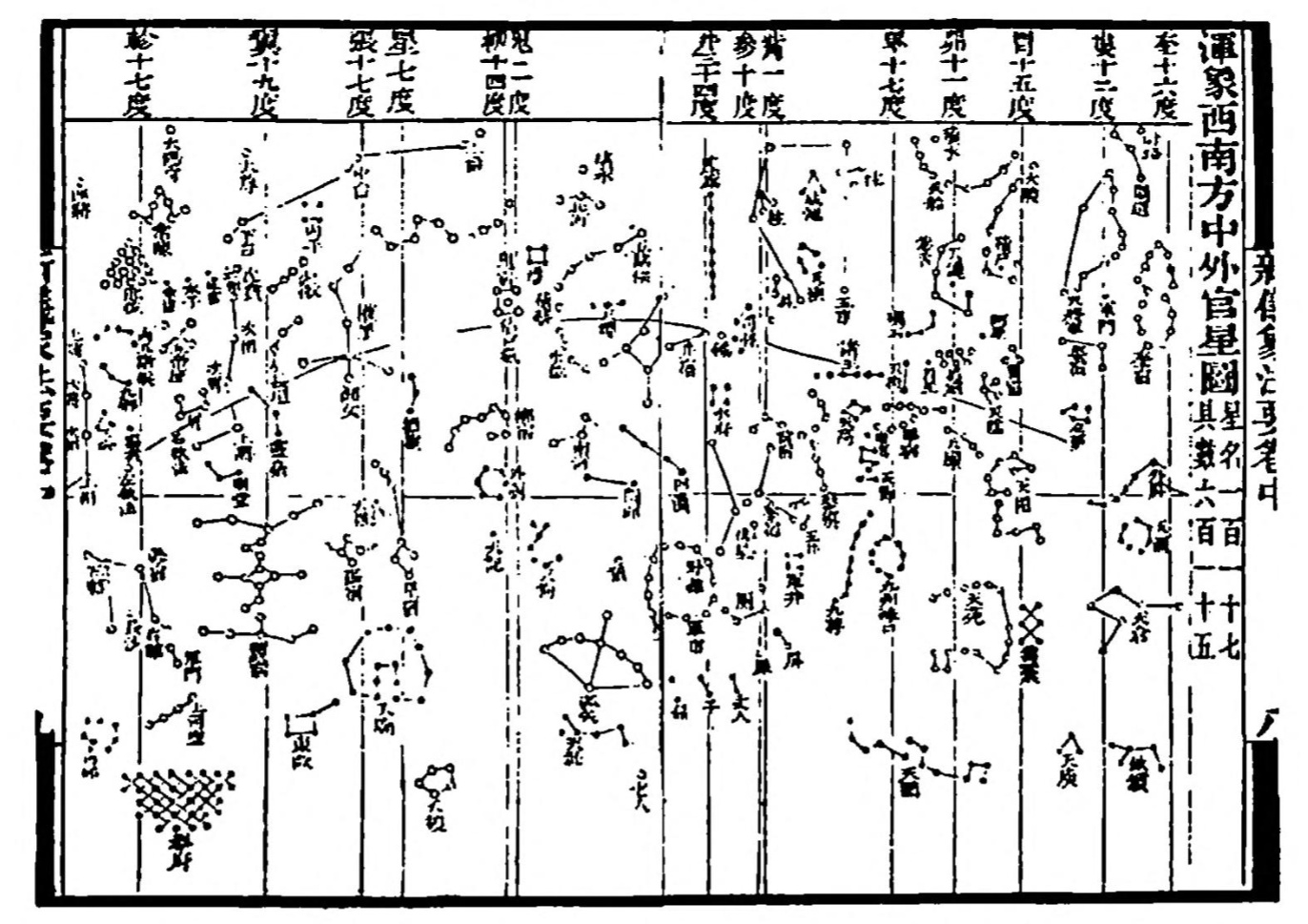
One of the five star maps published in 1092 AD for Su Song's horological and astronomical treatise, featuring Shen Kuo's corrected position of the pole star.

Being the head official for the Bureau of Astronomy, Shen Kuo was an avid scholar of medieval astronomy, and improved the designs of several astronomical instruments. Shen is credited with making improved designs of the gnomon, armillary sphere, and clepsydra clock. For the clepsydra he designed a new overflow-tank type, and argued for a more efficient higher-order interpolation instead of linear interpolation in calibrating the measure of time. Improving the 5th century model of the astronomical sighting tube, Shen Kuo widened its diameter so that the new calibration could observe the pole star indefinitely. This came about due to the position of the pole star shifting in position since the time of Zu Geng in the 5th century, hence Shen Kuo diligently observed the course of the pole star for three months, plotting the data of its course and coming to the conclusion that it had shifted slightly over three degrees. Apparently this astronomical finding had an impact upon the intellectual community in China at the time. Even Shen's political rival and contemporary astronomer Su Song featured Shen's corrected position of the pole star (halfway between Tian shu, at −350 degrees, and the current Polaris) in the fourth star map of his celestial atlas.

The astronomical phenomena of the solar eclipse and lunar eclipse had been observed in the 4th century BC by astronomers Gan De and Shi Shen; the latter gave instructions on predicting the eclipses based on the relative position of the Moon to the Sun. The philosopher Wang Chong argued against the 'radiating influence' theory of Jing Fang's writing in the 1st century BC and that of Zhang Heng (78–139); the latter two correctly hypothesized that the brightness of the Moon was merely light reflected from the Sun. Jing Fang had written in the 1st century BC of how it was long accepted in China that the Sun and Moon were spherical in shape ('like a crossbow bullet'), not flat. Shen Kuo also wrote of solar and lunar eclipses in this manner, yet expanded upon this to explain why the celestial bodies were spherical, going against the 'flat Earth' theory for celestial bodies. However, there is no evidence to suggest that Shen Kuo supported a round earth theory, which was introduced into Chinese science by Matteo Ricci and Xu Guangqi in the 17th century. When the Director of the Astronomical Observatory asked Shen Kuo if the shapes of the Sun and Moon were round like balls or flat like fans, Shen Kuo explained that celestial bodies were spherical because of knowledge of waxing and waning of the Moon. Much like what Zhang Heng had said, Shen Kuo likened the Moon to a ball of silver, which does not produce light, but simply reflects light if provided from another source (the Sun). He explained that when the Sun's light is slanting, the Moon appears full. He then explained if one were to cover any sort of sphere with white powder, and then viewed from the side it would appear to be a crescent, hence he reasoned that celestial bodies were spherical. He also wrote that, although the Sun and Moon were in conjunction and opposition with each other once a month, this did not mean the Sun would be eclipsed every time their paths met, because of the small obliquity of their orbital paths.

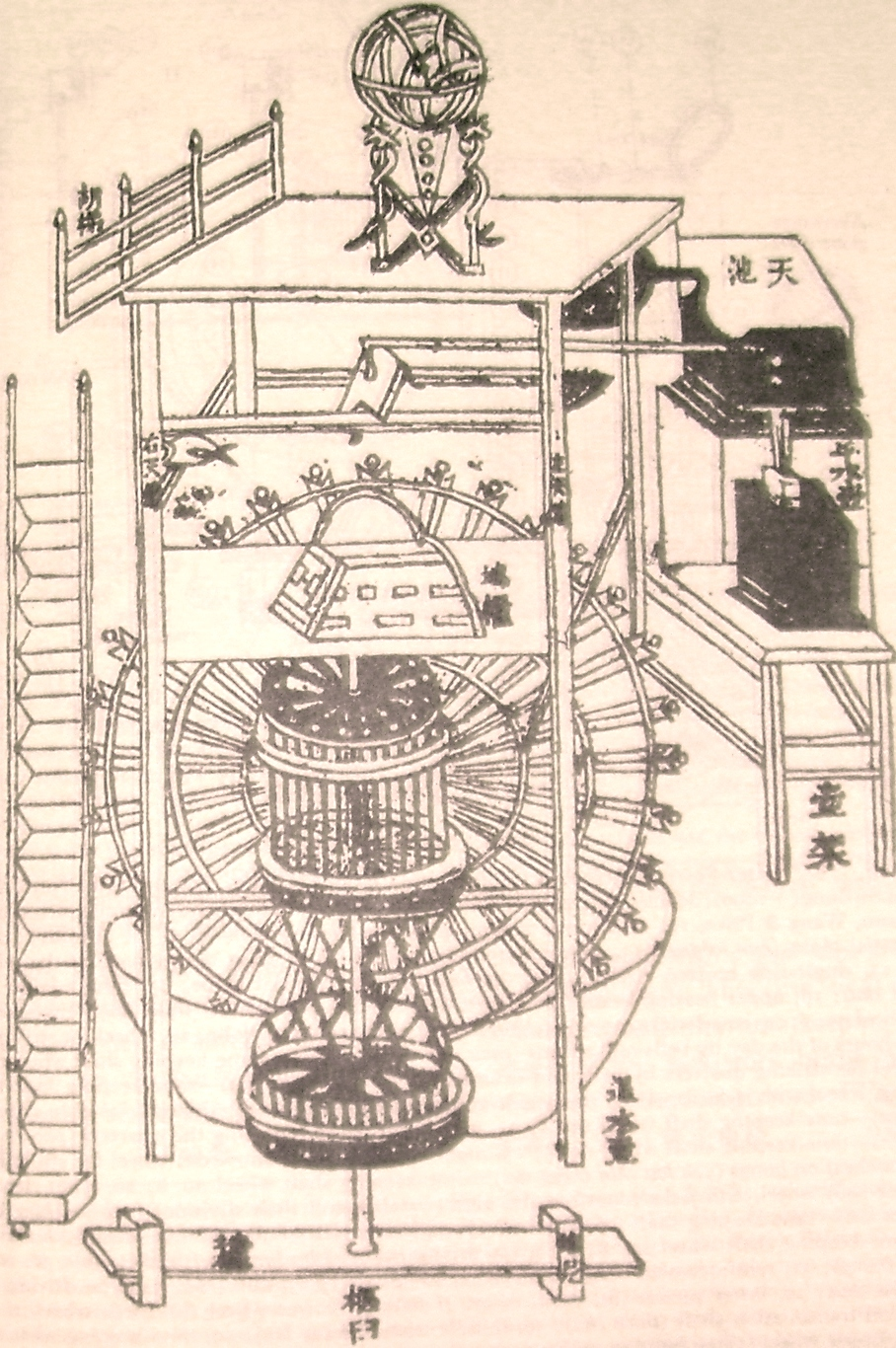
The original diagram of Su Song's book of 1092 showing the inner workings of his clocktower; a mechanically rotated armillary sphere crowns the top.

Shen is also known for his cosmological hypotheses in explaining the variations of planetary motions, including retrogradation. His colleague Wei Pu realized that the old calculation technique for the mean Sun was inaccurate compared to the apparent Sun, since the latter was ahead of it in the accelerated phase of motion, and behind it in the retarded phase. Shen's hypotheses were similar to the concept of the epicycle in the Greco-Roman tradition, only Shen compared the side-section of orbital paths of planets and variations of planetary speeds to points in the tips of a willow leaf. In a similar rudimentary physical analogy of celestial motions, as John B. Henderson describes it, Shen likened the relationship of the Moon's path to the ecliptic, the path of the Sun, "to the figure of a rope coiled about a tree."

Along with his colleague Wei Pu in the Bureau of Astronomy, Shen Kuo planned to plot out the exact coordinates of planetary and lunar movements by recording their astronomical observations three times a night for a continuum of five years. The Song astronomers of Shen's day still retained the lunar theory and coordinates of the earlier Yi Xing, which after 350 years had devolved into a state of considerable error. Shen criticized earlier Chinese astronomers for failing to describe celestial movement in spatial terms, yet he did not attempt to provide any reasoning for the motive power of the planets or other celestial movements. Shen and Wei began astronomical observations for the Moon and planets by plotting their locations three times a night for what should have been five successive years. The officials and astronomers at court were deeply opposed to Wei and Shen's work, offended by their insistence that the coordinates of Yi Xing were inaccurate. They also slandered Wei Pu, out of resentment that a commoner had expertise exceeding theirs. When Wei and Shen made a public demonstration using the gnomon to prove the doubtful wrong, the other ministers reluctantly agreed to correct the lunar and solar errors. Despite this success, they eventually dismissed Wei and Shen's tables of planetary motions. Therefore, only the worst and most obvious planetary errors were corrected, and many inaccuracies remained.

=== Movable type printing ===
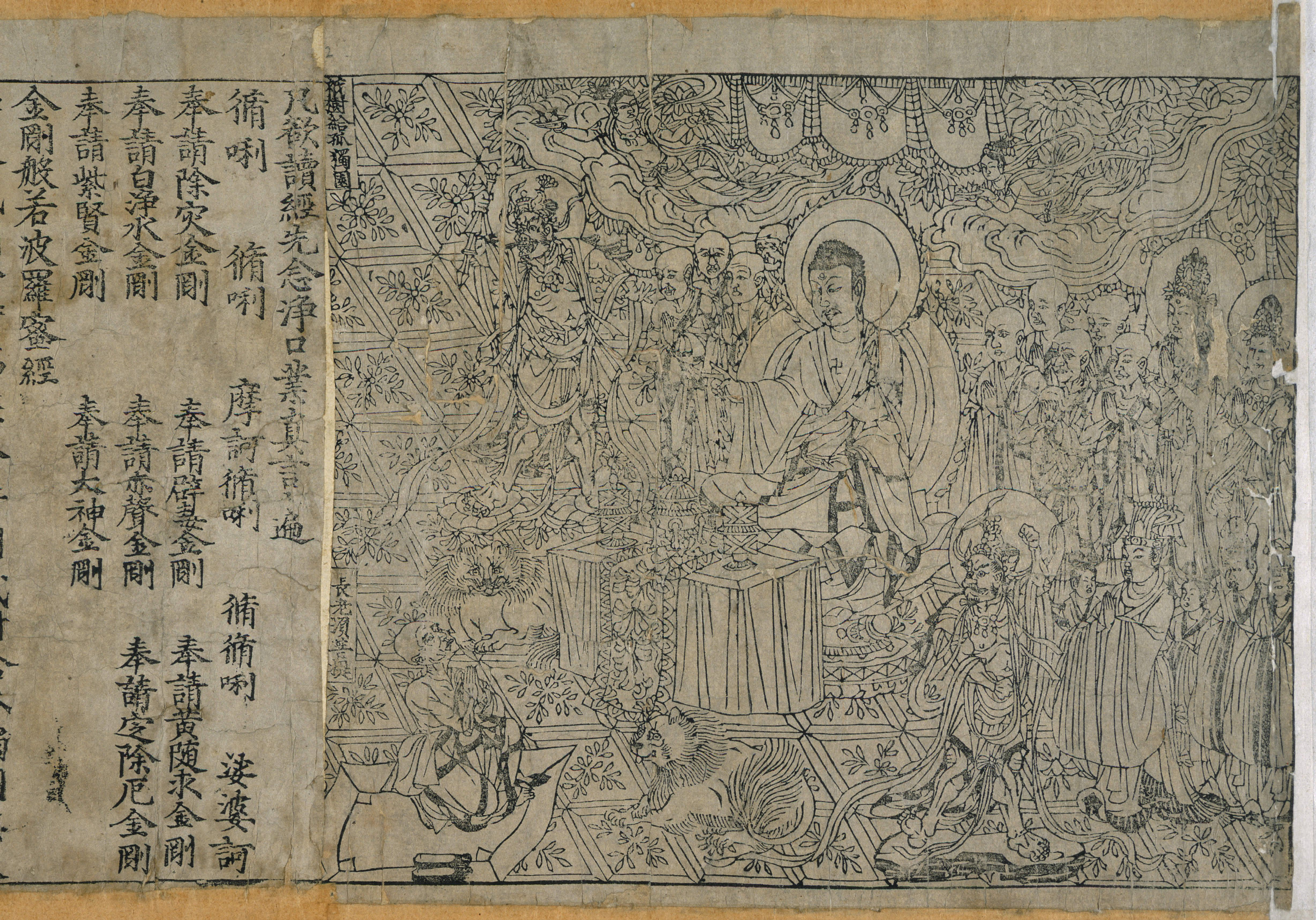
The Chinese Diamond Sutra, the oldest known printed book in world history (868), using woodblock printing

Shen Kuo wrote that during the Qingli reign period (1041–1048), under Emperor Renzong of Song (1022–1063), an obscure commoner and artisan known as Bi Sheng (990–1051) invented ceramic movable type printing. Although the use of assembling individual characters to compose a piece of text had its origins in antiquity, Bi Sheng's methodical innovation was something completely revolutionary for his time. Shen Kuo noted that the process was tedious if one only wanted to print a few copies of a book, but if one desired to make hundreds or thousands of copies, the process was incredibly fast and efficient. Beyond Shen Kuo's writing, however, nothing is known of Bi Sheng's life or the influence of movable type in his lifetime. Although the details of Bi Sheng's life were scarcely known, Shen Kuo wrote:

When Bi Sheng died, his fount of type passed into the possession of my followers (i.e. one of Shen's nephews), among whom it has been kept as a precious possession until now.

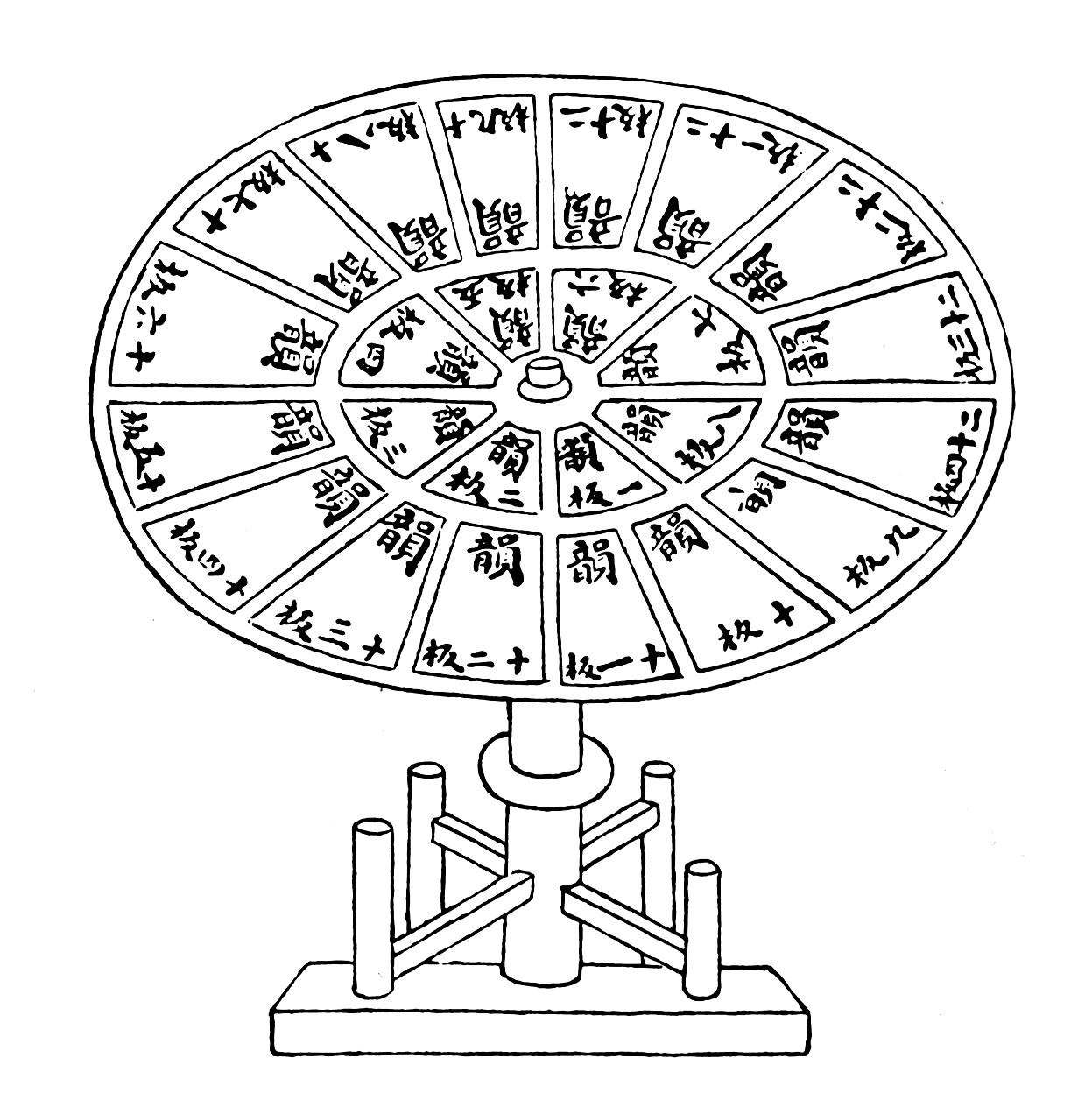
A revolving table typecase with individual movable type characters arranged primarily by rhyming scheme, from Wang Zhen's book of agriculture published in 1313

There are a few surviving examples of books printed in the late Song dynasty using movable type printing. This includes Zhou Bida's Notes of The Jade Hall (玉堂雜記) printed in 1193 using the method of baked-clay movable type characters outlined in the Dream Pool Essays. Yao Shu (1201–1278), an advisor to Kublai Khan, once persuaded a disciple Yang Gu to print philological primers and Neo-Confucian texts by using what he termed the "movable type of Shen Kuo". Wang Zhen (fl. 1290–1333), who wrote the valuable agricultural, scientific, and technological treatise of the Nong Shu, mentioned an alternative method of baking earthenware type with earthenware frames in order to make whole blocks. Wang Zhen also improved its use by inventing wooden movable type in the years 1297 or 1298, while he was a magistrate of Jingde, Anhui province. The earlier Bi Sheng had experimented with wooden movable type, but Wang's main contribution was improving the speed of typesetting with simple mechanical devices, along with the complex, systematic arrangement of wooden movable type involving the use of revolving tables. Although later metal movable type would be used in China, Wang Zhen experimented with tin metal movable type, but found its use to be inefficient.

By the 15th century, metal movable type printing was developed in Ming dynasty China (and earlier in Goryeo Korea, by the mid 13th century), and was widely applied in China by at least the 16th century. In Jiangsu and Fujian, wealthy Ming era families sponsored the use of metal type printing (mostly using bronze). This included the printing works of Hua Sui (1439–1513), who pioneered the first Chinese bronze-type movable printing in the year 1490. In 1718, during the mid Qing dynasty (1644–1912), the scholar of Tai'an known as Xu Zhiding developed movable type with enamelware instead of earthenware. There was also Zhai Jinsheng (b. 1784), a teacher of Jingxian, Anhui, who spent thirty years making a font of earthenware movable type, and by 1844 he had over 100,000 Chinese writing characters in five sizes.

Despite these advances, movable type printing never gained the amount of widespread use in East Asia that woodblock printing had achieved since the Chinese Tang dynasty in the 9th century. With written Chinese, the vast amount of written morpheme characters impeded movable type's acceptance and practical use, and was therefore seen as largely unsatisfactory. Furthermore, the European printing press, first invented by Johannes Gutenberg (1398–1468), was eventually wholly adopted as the standard in China, yet the tradition of woodblock printing remains popular in East Asian countries.

=== Other achievements in science and technology ===
Shen Kuo described the phenomena of natural predator insects controlling the population of pests, the latter of which had the potential to wreak havoc upon the agricultural base of China.

Shen also wrote about advancements in metallurgy. While visiting the iron-producing district at Cizhou in 1075, Shen described the "partial decarburization" method of reforging cast iron under a cold blast, which Hartwell, Needham, and Wertime state is the predecessor of the Bessemer process. Shen was worried about deforestation (Note: For deforestation due to the Song dynasty iron industry and efforts to curb it, refer to Economy of the Song dynasty) due to the needs of the iron industry and ink makers using pine soot in the production process, so he suggested for the latter an alternative of petroleum, which he believed was "produced inexhaustibly within the earth". Shen used the soot from the smoke of burned petroleum fuel (石油 Shíyóu, "rock oil" as Shen called it) to invent a new, more durable type of writing ink; the Ming dynasty pharmacologist Li Shizhen (1518–1593) wrote that Shen's ink was "lustrous like lacquer, and superior to that made from pinewood lamp-black," or the soot from pinewood.

=== Beliefs and philosophy ===
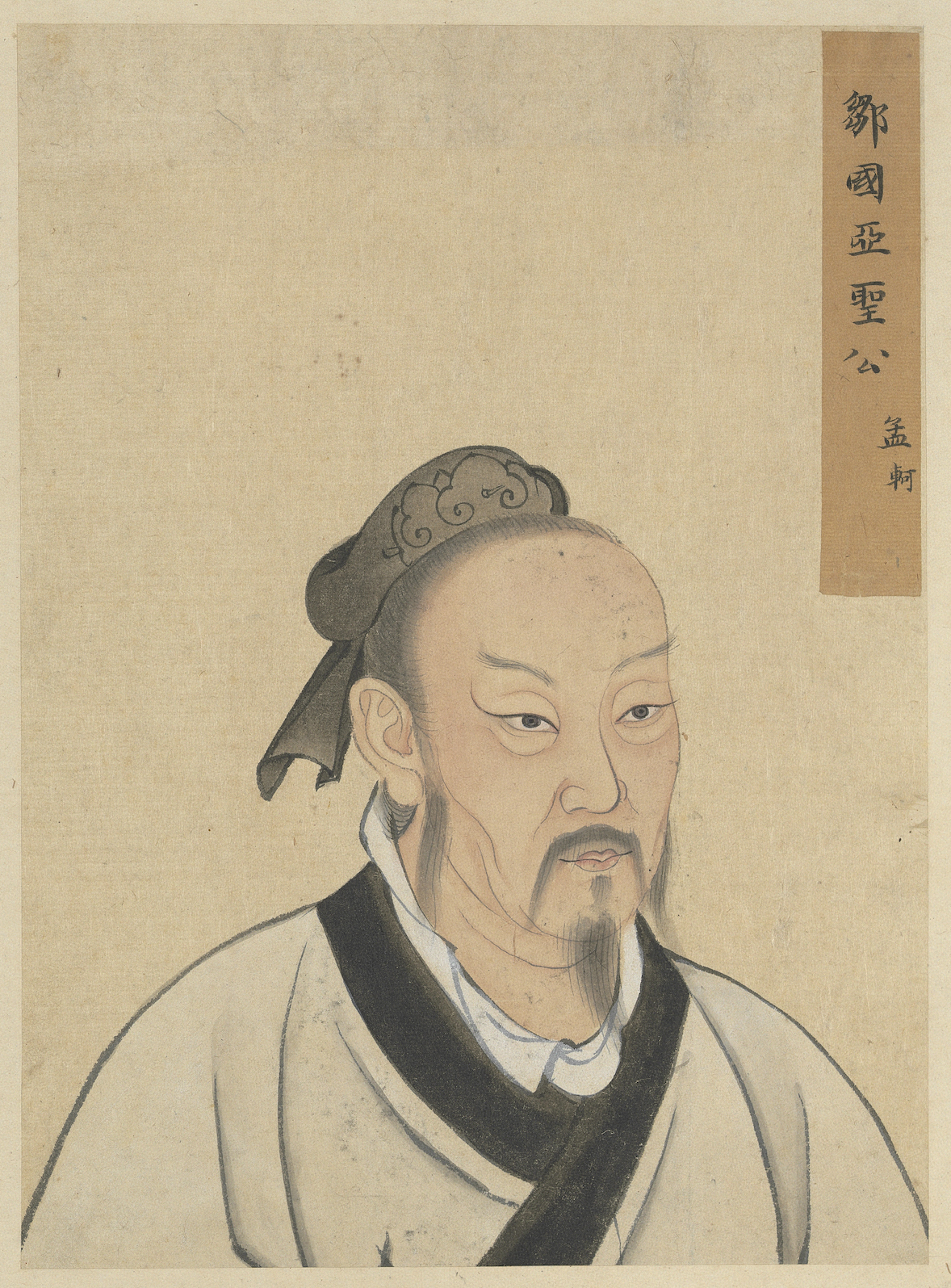
Ideas of the philosopher Mencius deeply influenced Shen.

Shen Kuo was much in favor of philosophical Daoist notions which challenged the authority of empirical science in his day. Although much could be discerned through empirical observation and recorded study, Daoism asserted that the secrets of the universe were boundless, something that scientific investigation could merely express in fragments and partial understandings. Shen Kuo referred to the ancient Daoist I Ching in explaining the spiritual processes and attainment of foreknowledge that cannot be attained through "crude traces", which he likens to mathematical astronomy. Nathan Sivin proposes that Shen was the first in history to "make a clear distinction between our unconnected experiences and the unitary causal world we postulate to explain them," which Biderman and Scharfstein state is arguably inherent in the works of Heraclitus, Plato, and Democritus as well. Shen was a firm believer in destiny and prognostication, and made rational explanations for the relations between them. Shen held a special interest in fate, mystical divination, bizarre phenomena, yet warned against the tendency to believe that all matters in life were preordained. When describing an event where lightning had struck a house and all the wooden walls did not burn (but simply turned black) and lacquerwares inside were fine, yet metal objects had melted into liquid, Shen Kuo wrote:

Most people can only judge of things by the experiences of ordinary life, but phenomena outside the scope of this are really quite numerous. How insecure it is to investigate natural principles using only the light of common knowledge, and subjective ideas.

In his commentary on the ancient Confucian philosopher Mencius (372–289 BC), Shen wrote of the importance of choosing to follow what one knew to be a true path, yet the heart and mind could not attain full knowledge of truth through mere sensory experience. In his own unique way but using terms influenced by the ideas of Mencius, Shen wrote of an autonomous inner authority that formed the basis for one's inclination towards moral choices, a concept linked to Shen's life experiences of surviving and obtaining success through self-reliance. Along with his commentary on the Chinese classic texts, Shen Kuo also wrote extensively on the topics of supernatural divination and Buddhist meditation.

In the "Strange Happenings" passage of the Dream Pool Essays, Shen offered accounts of an unidentified flying object that occurred during the reign of Emperor Renzong (1022–1063). An object as bright as a pearl was said to occasionally hover over the city of Yangzhou at night, and was previously described by local inhabitants of eastern Anhui and then in Jiangsu. A man near Xingkai Lake observed the same object, alleging that it emitted powerful lights from its interior like sunbeams illuminating the woods over a ten-mile radius before departing at tremendous speeds. Shen recorded that Yibo, a poet of Gaoyou, wrote a poem about this "pearl" after witnessing it and that locals around Fanliang in Yangzhou erected a "Pearl Pavilion" where spectators on boats hoped to spot the mysterious flying object again.

=== Art criticism ===
A painting by Dong Yuan, who Shen praised for his ability to portray landscapes and natural scenery in a grand but realistic style.

As an art critic, Shen criticized the paintings of Li Cheng (919–967) for failing to observe the principle of "seeing the small from the viewpoint of the large" in portraying buildings and the like. He praised the works of Dong Yuan (c. 934–c. 962); he noted that although a close-up view of Dong's work would create the impression that his brush techniques were cursory, seen from afar his landscape paintings would give the impression of grand, resplendent, and realistic scenery. In addition, Shen's writing on Dong's artworks represents the earliest known reference to the Jiangnan style of painting. In his "Song on Painting" and in his Dream Pool Essays, Shen praised the creative artworks of the Tang painter Wang Wei (701–761); Shen noted that Wang was unique in that he "penetrated into the mysterious reason and depth of creative activity," but was criticized by others for not conforming his paintings to reality, such as his painting with a banana tree growing in a snowy, wintry landscape.

== Written works ==
Much of Shen Kuo's written work was probably purged under the leadership of minister Cai Jing (1046–1126), who revived the New Policies of Wang Anshi, although he set out on a campaign of attrition to destroy or radically alter the written work of his predecessors and especially Conservative enemies. For example, only six of Shen's books remain, and four of these have been significantly altered since the time they were penned by the author.

In modern times, the best attempt at a complete list and summary of Shen's writing was an appendix written by Hu Daojing in his standard edition of Brush Talks, written in 1956.

=== Dream Pool Essays ===
Shen Kuo's Dream Pool Essays consists of some 507 separate essays exploring a wide range of subjects. It addressed scientific knowledge in areas including physics, astrology, mathematics, and medicine; it contended that there was no contradiction between technology and Confucian precepts. The text was Shen's ultimate attempt to comprehend and describe a multitude of various aspects of nature, science, and reality, and all the practical and profound curiosities found in the world. The literal translation of the title, Dream Brook Brush Talks, refers to his Dream Brook estate, where he spent the last years of his life. About the title, he is quoted as saying: "Because I had only my writing brush and ink slab to converse with, I call it Brush Talks." (Note: From his biography in the Dictionary of Scientific Biography (New York 1970–1990))

The book was originally 30 chapters long, yet an unknown Chinese author's edition of 1166 edited and reorganized the work into 26 chapters.

=== Other written works ===
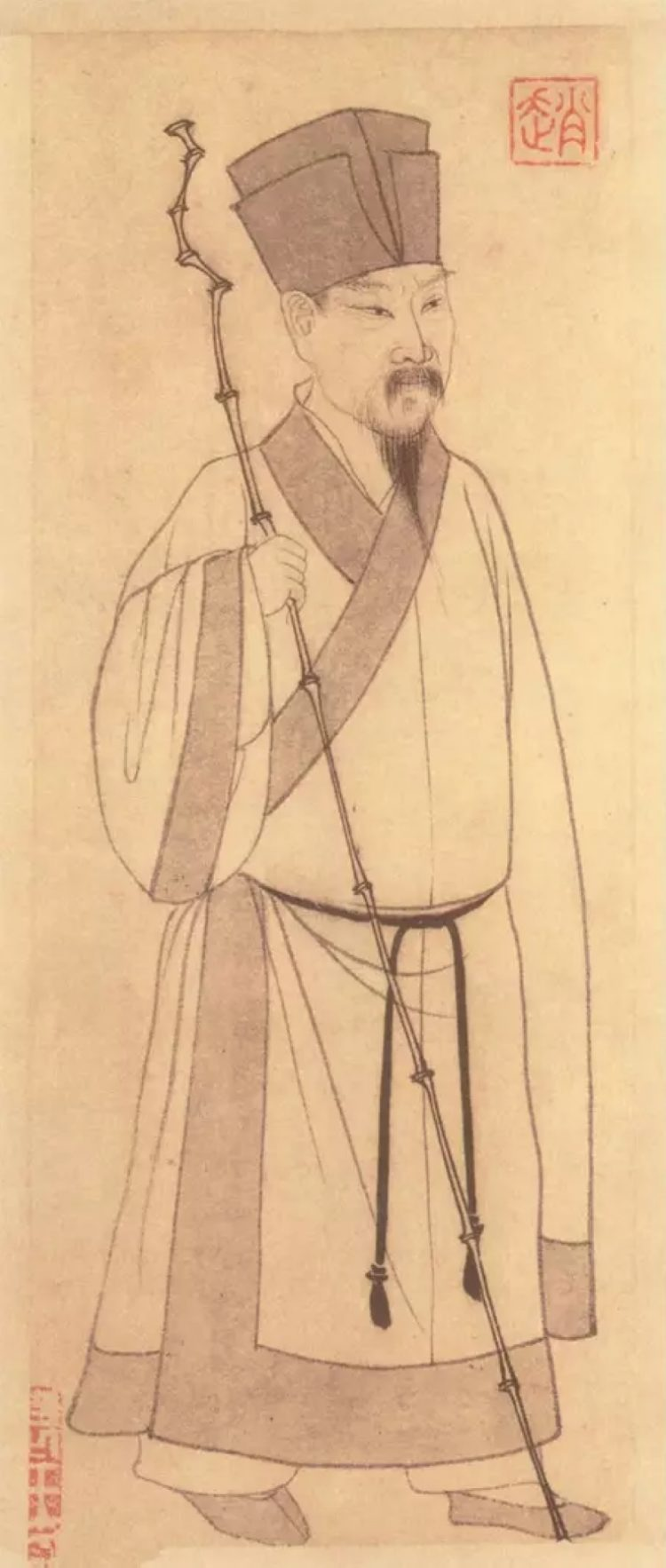
Poet and statesman Su Shi, whose pharmaceutical work was combined with Shen Kuo's in 1126, in a Yuan dynasty portrait by Zhao Mengfu

Although the Dream Pool Essays is certainly his most extensive and important work, Shen Kuo wrote other books as well. In 1075, Shen Kuo wrote the Xining Fengyuan Li (熙寧奉元曆; The Oblatory Epoch astronomical system of the Splendid Peace reign period), which was lost, but listed in a 7th chapter of a Song dynasty bibliography. This was the official report of Shen Kuo on his reforms of the Chinese calendar, which were only partially adopted by the Song court's official calendar system. During his years of retirement from governmental service, Shen Kuo compiled a formulary known as the Liang Fang (良方; Good medicinal formulas). Around the year 1126 it was combined with a similar collection by the famous Su Shi (1037–1101), who was ironically a political opponent to Shen Kuo's faction of Reformers and New Policies supporters at court, yet it was known that Shen Kuo and Su Shi were nonetheless friends and associates. Shen wrote the Mengqi Wanghuai Lu (夢溪忘懷錄; Record of longings forgotten at Dream Brook), which was also compiled during Shen's retirement. This book was a treatise in the working since his youth on rural life and ethnographic accounts of living conditions in the isolated mountain regions of China. Only quotations of it survive in the Shuo Fu (說郛) collection, which mostly describe the agricultural implements and tools used by rural people in high mountain regions. Shen Kuo also wrote the Changxing Ji (長興集; Collected Literary Works of [the Viscount of] Changxing). However, this book was without much doubt a posthumous collection, including various poems, prose, and administrative documents written by Shen. By the 15th century (during the Ming dynasty), this book was reprinted, yet only the 19th chapter remained. This chapter was reprinted in 1718, yet poorly edited. Finally, in the 1950s the author Hu Daojing supplemented this small yet valuable work with additions of other scattered poems written by Shen, in the former's Collection of Shen Kua's Extant Poetry (Shanghai: Shang-hai Shu-tian, 1958). In the tradition of the popular Song era literary category of 'travel record literature' ('youji wenxue'), Shen Kuo also wrote the Register of What Not to Forget, a traveler's guide to what type of carriage is suitable for a journey, the proper foods one should bring, the special clothing one should bring, and many other items.

In his Sequel to Numerous Things Revealed, the Song author Cheng Dachang (1123–1195) noted that stanzas prepared by Shen Kuo for military victory celebrations were later written down and published by Shen. This includes a short poem "Song of Triumph" by Shen Kuo, who uses the musical instrument mawei huqin ('horse-tail barbarian stringed instrument' or 'horse-tail fiddle') of the northwestern Inner Asian nomads as a metaphor for prisoners-of-war led by Song troops:

The mawei huqin followed the Han chariot,

Its music sounding of complaint to the Khan.

Do not bend the bow to shoot the goose within the clouds,

The returning goose bears no letter.

— Shen Kuo

Historian Jonathan Stock notes that the bent bow described in the poem above represents the arched bow used to play the huqin, while the sound of the instrument itself represented the discontent expressed by the prisoners-of-war with their defeated khan.

== Legacy ==
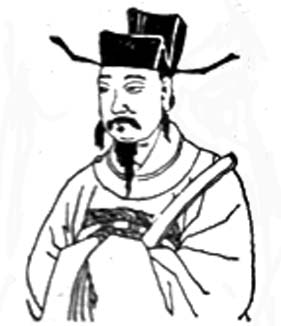
A sketch of Shen Kuo by an anonymous artist of the Qing dynasty, 18th century

=== Praise, critique, and criticism ===
In the Routledge Curzon Encyclopedia of Confucianism, Xinzhong Yao states that Shen Kuo's legacy was tainted by his eager involvement in Wang Anshi's New Policies reforms, his actions criticized in the later traditional histories. However, Shen's reputation as a polymath has been well regarded. Joseph Needham stated that Shen Kuo was "one of the greatest scientific minds in Chinese history." The French sinologist Jacques Gernet is of the opinion that Shen possessed an "amazingly modern mind." Yao states of Shen's thorough recording of natural sciences in his Dream Pool Essays:

We must regard Shen Kuo's collection as an indispensable primary source attesting to the unmatched level of attainment achieved by Chinese science prior to the twelfth century.

However, Toby E. Huff writes that Shen Kuo's "scattered set" of writings lacks clear-cut organization and "theoretical acuteness," that is, scientific theory. Nathan Sivin wrote that Shen's originality stands "cheek by jowl with trivial didacticism, court anecdotes, and ephemeral curiosities" that provide little insight. Donald Holzman writes that Shen "has nowhere organized his observations into anything like a general theory." Huff writes that this was a systemic problem of early Chinese science, which lacked systematic treatment that could be found in European works such as the Concordance and Discordant Canons by the lawyer Gratian of Bologna (fl. 12th century). In regard to an overarching concept of science which could branch together all the various sciences studied by the Chinese, Sivin asserts that the writings of Shen Kuo "do not indicate that he achieved, or even sought, an integrated framework for his diverse knowledge; the one common thread is the varied responsibilities of his career as a high civil servant."

=== Burial and posthumous honors ===
Upon his death, Shen Kuo was interred in a tomb in Yuhang District of Hangzhou, at the foot of the Taiping Hill. His tomb was eventually destroyed, yet Ming dynasty records indicated its location, which was found in 1983 and protected by the government in 1986. The remnants of the tomb's brick structure remained, along with Song dynasty glasswares and coins. The Hangzhou Municipal Committee completed a restoration of Shen's tomb in September 2001.

In addition to his tomb, Shen Kuo's Mengxi garden estate, his former two-acre (8,000 m^{2}) property in Zhenjiang, was restored by the government in 1985. However, the renovated Mengxi Garden is only part of the original of Shen Kuo's time. A Qing dynasty-era hall built on the site is now used as the main admissions gate. In the Memorial Hall of the gardens, there is a large painting depicting the original garden of Shen Kuo's time, including wells, green bamboo groves, stone-paved paths, and decorated walls of the original halls. In this exhibition hall there stands a 1.4 m (4.6 ft) tall statue of Shen Kuo sitting on a platform, along with centuries-old published copies of his Dream Pool Essays in glass cabinets, one of which is from Japan. At the garden estate there are also displayed marble banners, statues of Shen Kuo, and a model of an armillary sphere; a small museum gallery depicts Shen's various achievements.

The Purple Mountain Observatory in Nanjing discovered a new asteroid in 1964 and named it after Shen Kuo (2027 Shen Guo).
