= Ma Jun (historian) =

Chinese historian

- 马骏
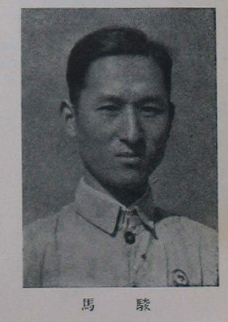
- Representative of the First Plenary Session of the Chinese People's Political Consultative Conference.
- Born: 1953 (age 72–73); Shenyang, Liaoning, China
- Education: Northeast Normal University; PLA National Defence University; Peking University
- Occupations: Historian, professor

Chinese name
- Traditional Chinese: 馬駿
- Simplified Chinese: 马骏
Transcriptions
Standard Mandarin
- Hanyu Pinyin: Mǎ Jùn

Ma Jun (Chinese: 马骏; born 1953) is a Chinese historian and professor at the PLA National Defence University. He is vice president of the History Research Association of the Second World War in China, a member of the German History Research Association in China and a member of the History Branch of the Chinese History Association. He holds the rank of senior colonel in the People's Liberation Army (PLA).

== Biography ==
Ma was born in Shenyang, Liaoning, China in 1953. During the Down to the Countryside Movement, he was a sent-down youth who worked in the fields instead of going to university.

After the resumption of college entrance examination, he was accepted to Northeast Normal University, earning a Bachelor of History degree. In 1982 he was assigned to Shenyang Artillery Academy, where he has successively served as a teacher, deputy company commander, company commander, etc. In 1985 he entered the PLA National Defence University, where he received his master's degree of military science. After graduation, he taught there. In 2000, he begin his education at Peking University, obtaining his degree of Doctor of Laws.

In 2006, Ma appeared on CCTV-10's Lecture Room programme.

== Works ==
- 马骏别解二战风云人物 [Ma Jun's Interpretation of World War II Figures] (in Chinese). Beijing: Guangming Daily Press. 2006. ISBN 9787802063686.
- 马骏细解二战谜中谜 [Ma Jun Explains the Mystery of World War II] (in Chinese). Beijing: Zhonghua Book Company. 2007. ISBN 9787101057508.
- 马骏点将：拿破仑 [Interpretation of Napoleon] (in Chinese). Beijing: Zhonghua Book Company. 2012. ISBN 978-7-101-08666-9.
- 马骏说孙子兵法 [Ma Jun on Art of War] (in Chinese). Beijing: Zhonghua Book Company. 2008. ISBN 9787101061956.
- 马骏：晚清军事揭秘 [Military Secrets of the Late Qing Dynasty] (in Chinese). Beijing: China Central Radio and Television University Press. 2008. ISBN 9787304041427.
- 女性与战争 [Women and War] (in Chinese). Beijing: China Development Press. 2007. ISBN 9787802340466.
- 为将之道 二战名将的成长之路与管理艺术 [The Art of Management and the Growth Path of Generals] (in Chinese). Beijing: China Youth Press. 2006. ISBN 9787500667056.
