= Pu Zhelong =

- 蒲蛰龙
- Born: 1912; Yunnan, China
- Died: 1997 (aged 84–85)
- Education: Sun Yat-sen University; University of Minnesota
- Known for: Academician of the Chinese Academy of Sciences; integrating international and Chinese scientific knowledge; contributions to "tu science"
- Awards: Academician of the Chinese Academy of Sciences (1980)
- Scientific career
- Fields: Entomology
- Workplaces: Sun Yat-sen University

Pu Zhelong (Chinese: 蒲蛰龙; 1912–1997) was a Chinese entomologist and an academician of the Chinese Academy of Sciences.

== Biography ==
Born in Yunnan, Pu's family was originally from Qinzhou, Guangxi. He graduated from Sun Yat-sen University College of Agriculture in 1935, earned his PhD at the University of Minnesota in 1949. He became Professor and Dean of Life Sciences at Sun Yat-sen University. He was elected an academician of the Chinese Academy of Sciences in 1980.

Pu is also known for his work of bringing together international (yang 洋， "foreign") scientific knowledge and Chinese (tu 土， "local") knowledge, thus playing an important, and exemplary role, in the history of science in the context of Chinese political history.

"Pu’s work also reflects the emphasis on nationalist self-reliance produced by economic constraints, China's odd position in Cold War geopolitics, and Maoist ideology. Although postsocialist biographies of Pu highlight his professional (yang) achievements and downplay his contributions to the self-reliance, mass mobilization, and nativism embodied in tu science, Pu's experience demonstrates that tu science could be a natural fit for agricultural scientists. At the same time, Pu skillfully navigated the tensions of the Cold War to serve as an effective agent of China's new form of transnationalism in the 1970s. China's renewal of relations with the United States did not result immediately in the rise of a more yang vision for science. Rather, Pu and others first mobilized their yang connections to promote the idea of a uniquely socialist Chinese tu science that China could offer to the world."
