= Wei Pu =

Wei Pu (Chinese: 衛朴; Wade-Giles: Wei P'u) was a Chinese astronomer and politician of the Northern Song dynasty. He was born a commoner, but eventually rose to prominence as an astronomer working for the imperial court at the capital of Kaifeng. Wei became a trusted colleague of the famous Northern Song polymath statesman and scientist Shen Kuo, who served as the head official for the Bureau of Astronomy, and worked on various projects with Wei Pu.

== Achievements at court ==
When Shen Kuo became the Supervisor of the Directorate of Astronomy in 1072 AD, Wei Pu became Shen's protégé, and was eager to partake in Shen's ideal reforms to the Chinese calendar system. With the aid of many different scholars and a large assortment of gathered books written on astronomy, Shen and Wei embarked on this enormous project. With the aid of Wei Pu, Shen planned to make a series of nightly astronomical observations over a period of five years. To allow more accurate astronomical observations and recordings, Shen Kuo improved the technical designs of the rotating armillary sphere, the gnomon, the clepsydra clock, and the sighting tube. Shen Kuo calibrated the standard diameter of the sighting tube's width, hence allowing the observation of the pole star indefinitely (which had shifted since the time of Zu Geng in the 5th century). With these, Shen and Wei attempted to predict the mean speeds of the planets as well as the accurate positions of the planets in their orbits. They established a system of observing and recording on a star map the exact coordinates of the planets, done three times a night for a total of five years. Shen Kuo made a cosmological hypotheses in explaining the variations of planetary motions, including the concept of retrogradation. On the other hand, Wei Pu realized that the old calculation technique for the mean sun was inaccurate compared to the apparent sun, since the latter was ahead of it in the accelerated phase of motion, and behind it in the retarded phase. Hence, he incorporated solar motion into the eclipse theory.

The Song Dynasty astronomers of Wei's day still retained the lunar theory and coordinates of the earlier Tang astronomer, mathematician, and mechanical engineer Yi Xing (683-727 AD), which after 350 years had devolved into a state of considerable error. To fix this, Shen and Wei kept similar astronomical records, three times a night over five years, for the orbital path of the moon. Wei and Shen's work was deeply opposed by the officials and fellow astronomers at court, who were offended by their insistence that the coordinates of the renowned Yi Xing were inaccurate. The elite, well-educated ministers and leading astronomers were also insulted by the fact that Wei Pu was born a commoner, yet held more expertise in his field than many of them. When Wei and Shen made a public demonstration using the gnomon to prove the doubtful wrong, the other ministers reluctantly agreed to correct the lunar error. Although correcting the lunar error was a success, the other ministers and officials eventually dismissed Wei and Shen's recorded course plotting of planetary motions, while the court relied upon the inefficient and older model. This meant that only the very worst errors were corrected for planetary motion, and in his disappointment, Shen wrote, "How sad that the backbiting of that bunch of calendar-makers could have kept him from bringing his art to fruition!"

== See also ==
- Science and technology of the Song Dynasty
