= Liu Yuanzhang =

Liu Yuanzhang (simplified Chinese: 刘源张; traditional Chinese: 劉源張; pinyin: Liú Yuánzhāng; January, 1925 – 3 April 2014 ) was an academician of the Chinese Academy of Engineering (CAE), and professor of quality management engineering at Shanghai University.
