= Ma Jun (environmental engineer) =

Chinese environmental engineer (born 1962)

- Born: July 1962 (age 64); China
- Education: Harbin Institute of Technology; Tongji University; Imperial College London
- Scientific career
- Fields: Sanitary engineering
- Workplaces: Harbin Institute of Technology
- Doctoral advisor: Li Guibai

Chinese name
- Traditional Chinese: 馬軍
- Simplified Chinese: 马军
Transcriptions
Standard Mandarin
- Hanyu Pinyin: Mǎ Jūn

Ma Jun (Chinese: 马军; born July 1962) is a Chinese environmental engineer who is a professor, doctoral supervisor and deputy dean of the School of Environment, Harbin Institute of Technology. He is a researcher of the State Key Laboratory of Urban Water Resource and Environment.

== Biography ==
Ma was born in July 1962. After the resumption of National College Entrance Examination in 1978, he matriculated at the Harbin Institute of Construction Engineering (now Harbin Institute of Technology), where he earned a bachelor's degree in 1982, a master's degree in 1985, and a doctor's degree in 1990. His doctoral supervisor was academician Li Guibai. He was a postdoctoral fellow at Tongji University from 1991 to 1993 and the Imperial College London from 1993 to 1995.

In January 1996, he became a researcher at the Imperial College London under a grant from the Royal Society. He was a visiting scholar at the Swiss Federal Water Research Center (October 2006–February 2007) and the University of Massachusetts (May 2003–August 2003). He taught at the Harbin Institute of Technology since 1985, what he was promoted to associate professor in 1993 and to full professor in 2004. He rose to become deputy dean of its School of Environment in March 2017.

== Honours and awards ==
- 1995 State Science and Technology Progress Award (Third Class)
- 1997 China Youth Science and Technology Award
- 1998 National Science Fund for Distinguished Young Scholars
- 1999 "Chang Jiang Scholar" (or " Yangtze River Scholar")
- 2002 State Technological Invention Award (Second Class)
- 2015 Fellow of the Royal Society of Chemistry (RSC)
- November 22, 2019 Member of the Chinese Academy of Engineering (CAE)
