= Li Rui (mathematician) =

Chinese mathematician

- Born: December 8, 1768; Suzhou, China
- Died: June 30, 1817 (aged 48); Suzhou, China
- Known for: Descartes' rule of signs
- Scientific career
- Fields: Mathematics

Li Rui (Chinese: 李锐; pinyin: Lǐ Ruì; 8 December 1768 in Suzhou – 30 June 1817 in Suzhou) was a Chinese mathematician. Li discovered independently an equivalent version of what is known today as Descartes' rule of signs.
