= Jianping Li =

Chinese meteorologist

Jianping Li (Chinese: 李建平) is a Professor of Meteorology at Institute of Atmospheric Physics (IAP), Chinese Academy of Sciences (CAS). He is also the Deputy Director of Key Laboratory of Atmospheric Sciences and Geophysical Fluid Dynamics (LASG), IAP/CAS, an affiliated faculty of University of Hawaii, USA, a Fellow of Royal Meteorological Society (RMetS), and a Lecture/Visiting Professor at Graduate University of CAS, Lanzhou University and Ocean University of China, and the Secretary-General of Chinese National Committee for IUGG.

He earned a BS, MS and PhD, respectively, in 1991, 1994 and 1997 from Lanzhou University. He is interested in climate dynamics and predictability, monsoon, annular modes and their impacts, etc. He has published more than 140 scientific papers, some books, and has won numerous awards. He is the chief scientist of two National Basic Research projects (973AIPO and 973ALS) of China. The 973AIPO focuses on ocean-atmosphere interaction over Asia (AIPO) and its impact on the short-term climate variation in China, and 973ALS on Air-land-sea (ALS) interactions in Asia and their role in the global change.

He serves on several academic committees such as Honours and Recognition Committee/International Union of Geodesy and Geophysics (IUGG), International Commission on Climate (ICCL), International Commission on Dynamical Meteorology (ICDM), WWRP Monsoon Panel, Lead Author of IPCC WG II, Working Group for UN Environment Consultation (WGUNEC), Chinese Association for Science and Technology (CAST), International Commission on Planetary Atmospheres and their Evolution (ICPAE), World Youth Earth Scientists (YES), and on the responsible editor of Theoretical and Applied Climatology, Advances in Atmospheric Sciences and Chinese Journal of the Atmospheric Sciences. Besides, he is the director of International Program Office of Asian Monsoon Years (AMY 2007-2012), and the co-coordinator of International Project of East Asian Climate (EAC).

In 2015, he was made a fellow of the IUGG.
