= Zu Gengzhi =

Early 6th-century Chinese mathematician

- Traditional Chinese: 祖暅之
- Simplified Chinese: 祖暅之
Transcriptions
Standard Mandarin
- Hanyu Pinyin: Zǔ Gèngzhī
- Wade–Giles: Tsu Keng-chih

Jingshuo (courtesy name)
- Traditional Chinese: 景爍
- Simplified Chinese: 景烁
Transcriptions
Standard Mandarin
- Hanyu Pinyin: Jǐngshuò

Zu Geng or Zu Gengzhi (Chinese: 祖暅之; Wade–Giles: Tsu Keng-chih; ca. 480 – ca. 525) was a Chinese mathematician, politician, and writer. His courtesy name was Jingshuo (景爍). He was the son of the famous mathematician Zu Chongzhi. He is known principally for deriving and proving the formula for the volume of a sphere. He additionally measured the angular distance between Polaris and the celestial north pole, which was greater 1600 years ago than it is today.

== See also ==
- List of Chinese mathematicians
