= TiVo Inc. =

Former American corporation

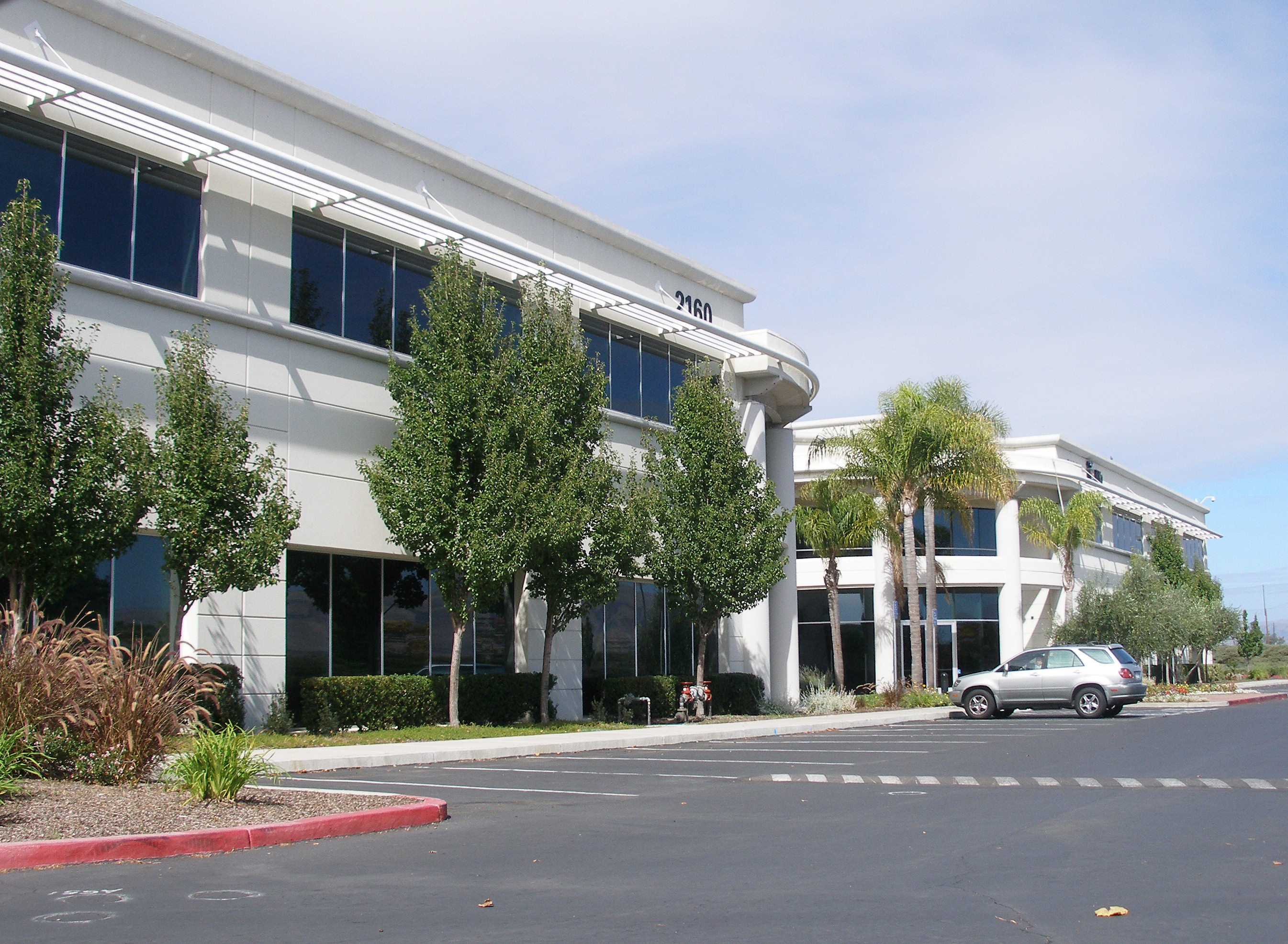
- TiVo headquarters in San Jose, California
- Formerly: Teleworld Inc. (1997-1999)
- Type: Public
- Traded as: Nasdaq: TIVO
- Industry: Digital video recorders
- Founded: August 4, 1997; 29 years ago
- Founders: Jim Barton; Mike Ramsay
- Defunct: September 8, 2016; 10 years ago
- Fate: Acquired by Rovi Corporation
- Successor: TiVo Corporation; Xperi
- Headquarters: San Jose, California, United States
- Key people: Tom Rogers (CEO)
- Products: TiVo DVR
- Revenue: ▲US$ 406 Million (2014)
- Net income: ▲US$ 271.8 Million (2014)
- Number of employees: 630 (2014)
- Website: tivo.com

TiVo Inc. was an American corporation with its primary product being its eponymous digital video recorder. While primarily operating in the United States, TiVO also operated in Australia, Canada, Mexico, New Zealand, Puerto Rico, Taiwan, the United Kingdom, and Western Europe. On September 8, 2016, TiVo Inc. was acquired by Rovi Corporation. The new entity became known as TiVo Corporation, which in turn, merged with Xperi in December 2019.

== History ==
The company TiVo Inc. was incorporated on August 4, 1997, as Teleworld, Inc. by Jim Barton and Mike Ramsay, former employees at Silicon Graphics and Time Warner's Full Service Network digital video system. Originally intending to create a home network device, they later developed the idea to record digitized video on a hard disk for a monthly service, at the suggestion of Randy Komisar. The original TiVo device digitized and compressed analog video from any source.

Teleworld began the first public trials of the TiVo device and service in late 1998 in the San Francisco Bay area.

Teleworld, Inc. renamed itself to TiVo Inc. on July 21, 1999, and made its IPO (Initial Public Offering) on September 30, 1999.

In June 2000, America Online acquired a 15% stake in the company.

In late 2000, Philips Electronics introduced the DSR6000, the first DirecTV receiver with an integrated TiVo DVR. This new device, nicknamed the DirecTiVo, stored digital signals sent from DirecTV directly onto a hard disk.

In early 2000, TiVo also partnered with electronics manufacturer Thomson and broadcaster British Sky Broadcasting to deliver the TiVo service in the UK market. This partnership resulted in the Thomson PVR10UK, a stand-alone receiver released in October 2000. In January 2003, After poor sales, TiVo pulled out of the UK market.

On January 27, 2004, TiVo announced the acquisition of Strangeberry Inc., a Palo Alto-based technology company specializing in using home network and broadband technologies to create new entertainment on television.

In 2004, TiVo sued EchoStar Corp, a manufacturer of DVR units, for patent infringement. The parties reached a settlement in 2011 wherein EchoStar paid TiVo a licensing fee for its technology.

In June 2005, Tom Rogers, a TiVo board member since 1999, was named president and chief executive officer of TiVo Inc.

In 2006, TiVo, Inc. won an Emmy Award for Outstanding Innovation and Achievement in Advanced Media Technology. TiVo was again awarded an Emmy in 2013 for Technical and Engineering Achievement for Personalized Recommendation Engines for Video Discovery.

On November 25, 2009, TiVo re-entered the UK market by announcing a partnership with UK cable company Virgin Media. By 2012, TiVo services had become a part of 18% of Virgin's TV customer base. By the end of 2013, TiVo was installed in 52%, or around 2 million, of all Virgin TV's subscribers.

On January 19, 2010, Microsoft filed a lawsuit against TiVo, Inc. for patent infringement. TiVo had also filed a lawsuit against Microsoft for patent infringement. The companies agreed to end their respective lawsuits in March 2012.

On July 17, 2012, TiVo announced the acquisition of TRA, Inc., an audience measurement company that measures advertising effectiveness.

On January 29, 2014, TiVo announced the acquisition of Digitalsmiths, a cloud-based content discovery and recommendation service for pay TV.

In March, 2015, TiVo purchased the assets of Aereo, a technology company that allowed subscribers to view live and time-shifted streams of over-the-air television on Internet-connected devices, for $1 million.

On April 29, 2016, Rovi announced that it had acquired TiVo Inc. for $1.1 billion, and that the combined company would operate under the TiVo brand. On September 8, 2016, the acquisition by Rovi Corporation was completed.

On December 19, 2019, TiVo and Xperi announced they had entered into a definitive merger agreement in an all-stock transaction, representing approximately $3 billion of combined enterprise value. The combined company's value creation plan will focus on integrating the companies’ respective product and IP licensing businesses.

== See also ==
- TiVo
- TiVo digital video recorders
