= Tom Rogers (executive) =

American businessman

- Education: Wesleyan University (BA); Columbia Law School (J.D.)
- Occupations: Businessman and attorney
- Employer(s): TiVo, Inc.
- Awards: Broadcasting & Cable Hall of Fame, Cable Hall of Fame

Tom Rogers is an American media and technology executive. He served as senior counsel to the U.S. House of Representatives Telecommunications Subcommittee. Rogers later became the first President of NBC Cable, founding CNBC and establishing MSNBC. He was also the longest serving CEO of TiVo, Inc.

== Early life and education ==
Rogers attended Scarsdale High School, where he was elected class president in 1972.

Rogers graduated in 1972 from Scarsdale High School in Scarsdale, New York; and later received degrees from Wesleyan University and Columbia Law School.

== Career ==
Rogers began his career as an attorney on Wall Street. Prior to NBC, Rogers was the senior counsel to the U.S. House of Representatives Telecommunications, Consumer Protection and Finance Subcommittee.

=== NBC Cable ===
Rogers was first president of NBC Cable (now NBCUniversal Cable) and executive vice president of NBC, as well as NBC's chief strategist. Rogers founded CNBC and established MSNBC.

During his tenure at NBC Cable, Rogers oversaw the establishment of the National Geographic Channel, Court TV and Independent Film Channel, and served as co-chairman of the board of A&E Television Networks and The History Channel for 10 years. In addition, he oversaw American Movie Classics, Bravo (U.S. TV network), and several regional sports channels. In 2003, New York Mayor Michael Bloomberg brought Rogers in to mediate a dispute between Cablevision and the YES Network.

In 2013, Rogers was inducted into the NAB Broadcasting Hall of Fame. Rogers was inducted into the Cable Hall of Fame in 2016.

=== TiVO ===
From 2005 to 2016, Rogers served as president and CEO of TiVo, as well as vice chairman of the board. TiVo was involved in the development of the DVR. Rogers won a 2006 Emmy Award for Outstanding Achievement In Enhanced or Interactive Television.

=== Other organizations ===
Rogers was chairman and CEO of Primedia (now Rent Group), a targeted media company in the United States beginning in 1999. Rogers served as the senior operating executive for media and entertainment for Cerberus Capital Management, a large private equity firm, and as chairman of the board of Teleglobe (now VSNL International Canada).

In March 2017, Rogers was appointed chairman of Frankly, a news distribution company. He served in this capacity until the merger creating Engine Media. Rogers was Chairman of Captify, a UK based advertising technology company. He was appointed to his post in 2018 and served in that capacity until the company's sale in 2022. Rogers has been executive chairman of Oorbit Gaming and Entertainment since September 2023. Rogers currently serves as Chairman of TRget Media, a media investment and operations advisory firm.

Rogers is editor-at-large for Newsweek, and writes columns on policy and political issues for the publication. Rogers also served four years as president of the International Television Academy.
