= JS Chiao =

Chinese microbiologist (1918–2009)

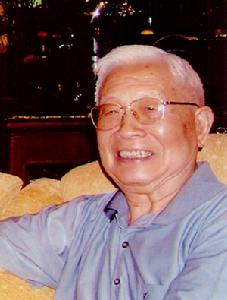
- Chiao at a conference, September 12, 2008
- Born: Jui-Sheng Jiao; September 13, 1918; Pingshan, Heibei, China
- Occupation: Microbiologist
- Years active: 1947–2009
- Children: Paul Chiao, Fan Jiao

Professor J. S. Chiao, born Jui-Sheng Jiao (13 September 1918 - 22 December 2009), was a microbiologist from the Shanghai Institute of Plant Physiology and Ecology of the Chinese Academy of Sciences, and a member of the American Society for Microbiology. Professor Chiao spent 60 years in microbiology research, and was one of the world's leading scientists on its application to the field of biotechnology.

== Early years ==
A native of Pingshan County, Hebei Province, Chiao was the first one in his family to receive a formal education. He began his studies in the Department of Chemistry, Tsinghua University, hoping to promote science in China. In July 1941, he completed his bachelor's degree at the National Southwestern Associated University (NSAU), which consisted of Tsinghua, Nankai, and Beijing universities, and relocated to Kunming during the Sino-Japanese War (1937–1945).

Later, Chiao was appointed a research assistant in the Department of Chemistry at NSAU. In September 1947, he received a scholarship from Washington State University Scholarship in the United States to study organic chemistry, and obtained his master's degree in March 1949. He continued his education at the University of Wisconsin, Madison and received his master's degree and Ph.D. in microbiology in 1950 and March 1953, respectively.

== Research career ==
In March 1953, Dr. Chiao became a senior researcher in Research & Development of micro-organisms at the Grain Processing Company in Muscatine, Iowa. Realizing China needed scientists, Chiao returned to the PRC in March 1955. From March 1955 to August 2004, Prof. Chiao served as Associate Research Staff, Research Staff, and Director of Research at the Chinese Academy of Sciences (CAS), Shanghai Institute of Plant Physiology and Ecology. He was also the Chairman of the Chinese Society for Microbiology, President of the Shanghai Society of Microbiology, Biotechnology Consultant of the State Science and Technology Development Center of Biotechnology, and Vice Chairman of the Committee of Experts of the Chinese Academy.

Chiao was the founder and editor of the journal "Microbiological Engineering News", and editor of "Micro Projects" at the Chinese Society of Microbiology. He successfully organized the Tenth International Symposium on the Biology of Actinomyces in 1997. This conference improved the standing of the Chinese Society of Microbiology in the International Union of Microbiological Societies and Chinese microbial academia. Because of his outstanding contributions to research in Microbiology, Chiao was elected by the American Society for Microbiology as an honorary member. He was also selected as a representative of the Shanghai Municipal People's Congress for two successive terms.

== Public notability ==
Professor Chiao made significant contributions to (i) microbial physiology and biochemistry, (ii) bio-engineering and basic research in the development of microbiology, (iii) modern biotechnology, and (iv) personnel training in China. He paid attention to advances in microbiology and biotechnology, providing guidance to Chinese microbiological research in the use of microbial physiology to enhance the promotion of industrial technology. He also advocated work on the genomes of uncultured microorganisms. For decades, he targeted industrial applications of microbiology. Chiao also promoted further studies on the basic theory of microbiology.

== Selected publications ==
- 1953 Microbiological Assay of Vitamin B12 with a Mutant Strain of Escherichia coli1
- 1956 Some factors affecting inhibitory action of thiamine on growth of Saccharomyces carlsbergensis, PMID 13363420
- 1989 Regulation of the biosynthetic pathway of aromatic amino acids in Nocardia mediterranei
- 1994 Cloning vector system for Nocardia spp
- 1995 Chorismate mutase and 3-deoxy-D-arabino-heptulosonate 7-phosphate synthase of the methylotrophic actinomycete Amycolatopsis methanolica
- "Cloning, sequencing and expression of a recA gene from Amycolatopsis mediterranei". Metapress. 2002.
- 2002-2005 various publications
- "A Novel Two-Component System amrB-amkB Involved in the Regulation of Central Carbohydrate Metabolism in Rifamycin SV-Producing Amycolatopsis mediterranei U32". Metapress. 2004.
- 2007 History of the Acetone-Butanol-Ethanol Fermentation Industry in China: Development of Continuous Production Technology, Journal of Molecular Microbiology and Biotechnology
- 1999-2007 BioMed Experts, part of publications in English
- "Identification and functional analysis of a nitrate assimilation operon nasACKBDEF from Amycolatopsis mediterranei U32". Springer-Link. 2011.
