= Atypon =

Online publishing platform provider

- Type: Subsidiary
- Industry: Software
- Founded: 1996; 30 years ago
- Headquarters: Santa Clara, California, US
- Key people: Georgios Papadopoulos (founder); Gordon Tibbitts (general manager); Hisham Shahtout (senior vice president of engineering)
- Products: Content management, content delivery, monetization, access control and ecommerce systems
- Parent: John Wiley & Sons
- Website: atypon.com

Atypon Systems, LLC is an online publishing platform provider for publishers and other providers of scientific, technical, medical, scholarly, professional and government content. It is headquartered in Santa Clara, California. It has been owned by John Wiley & Sons since 2016.

Atypon’s flagship product is Literatum, which was released in 1999. It is a publishing and website development platform that enables content providers to deliver, market and sell any type of digital content as well as to control the user interface and user experience of their publication websites.

== History ==
The company was founded in Silicon Valley in 1996 by software engineer and Fulbright Scholar Georgios Papadopoulos.

Atypon has grown both organically and through acquisitions. It acquired Extenza e-Publishing Services in 2011.

The acquisition of eMeta in 2008 expanded Atypon’s product portfolio to include RightSuite, an enterprise access and commerce platform for the publishing and media industry. Atypon acquired the Metapress business from EBSCO Information Services in 2014, with the Metapress platform to be discontinued and customers moved to Atypon's Literatum platform.

In October 2016, Atypon was purchased by academic publisher John Wiley & Sons for $120 million. Atypon operates as a separate, independent business unit of Wiley.

In 2018, Wiley migrated its own Wiley Online Library to Literatum.

Atypon has grown internationally, expanding on its initial primary locations in Amman, Jordan, Athens, Greece, Oxford, UK, Santa Clara, CA, and New York, NY to a remote-first workplace

== Products and services ==
Literatum is a hosted e-publishing platform that is used to manage, deliver and monetize online content. It consists of six modules for designing and building websites, hosting and managing content, managing user access, targeting advertising, simplifying e-commerce, and reporting and analyzing site activity. The platform is home to more than 13,000 journals containing almost 27 million articles. Atypon’s clients include scholarly and academic publishers such as SAGE Publishing, Taylor & Francis and the University of Chicago Press; journals including The New England Journal of Medicine; professional societies such as the American Veterinary Medical Association and the Society of Exploration Geophysicists; and state and U.S. federal government agencies such as the National Institute of Environmental Health Services. The platform hosts publications in more than a dozen languages other than English, including Mandarin, and Japanese.

RightSuite is an enterprise access and commerce platform that provides authentication, authorization, administration, registration and licensing functionality for digital goods and services. It is available as server applications and as software-as-a-service.

Atypon sponsors two user conferences each year: Engage North America, held the day after the Annual Meeting of the Society for Scholarly Publishing each spring, and Engage Europe, held the first week of each December, typically in London.

== See also ==
- Cohesity
- DataGrail
