= TivoWeb =

Web server

TivoWeb is a web server which runs in TiVo-branded DVRs.

It adds functionality to TiVo such as being able to set recordings over the internet and undelete deleted shows. It also allows the addition of custom modules which add more features to TivoWeb.

There are three main versions of TivoWeb still in day-to-day use. TivoWeb 1.9.4 is the original TivoWeb project and is no longer maintained; the last release of it was v1.9.4. (Note: An installation tivoweb.tar.gz file for this version can be downloaded from http://www.tivocentral.co.uk/hacks/tivoweb.html) The original TivoWeb project has been followed by TivoWebPlus v1.0 to v1.3.1 and then more recently by TivoWebPlus 2.0.0. and 2.1.0. TivoWeb 1.9.4 modules will usually work under TivoWebPlus v1.0 to v1.3.1; however, this version of TivoWebPlus has also frequently been criticized for being relatively unstable and prone to crashes and module hangs, especially on TiVos running large satellite or cable TV platform databases.

This resulted in the release of TivoWebPlus v2, a complete rewrite of the original TivoWeb code aimed at greatly increasing the stability of TivoWeb and also adding the ability to take advantage of the advanced hardware functionality of the very latest TiVo models whilst still also being compatible with the original Series 1 US and UK TiVo units. TivoWeb 1.9.4 and TivoWebPlus v1.0 to v1.3 modules do not work under TivoWebPlus v2 without certain internal alterations and amendments. However, the majority of modules and functionality add-ons from TivoWeb 1.9.4 and TivoWebPlus 1.0 to 1.3.1 have now been incorporated into TivoWebPlus 2.1.b3 (the current version at 25/2/09) and Portland Paw has also written a version of his www.tivohackman.com module that is directly compatible with this version of the TivoWeb project.

== Current and historical TivoWeb modules and related TiVo user interface extensions ==
Module name/link	Module description
Autospace	This tcl program replaces the Now Playing banner in the Now Playing list on the TiVo with a graphic showing the number of recordings and number of Suggestions as well as the volume of currently available free hard drive disk space. Its operation can be managed from Tivoweb's Startup Editor module or from the Tivoweb Hackman module.
Back-up Season Passes	Creates a backup of users' Season Passes without having to remove the TiVo HD.
Bulk edit season passes	Change all season passes at once. E.g. all to record at best
Bufferhack	This utility allows users to alter the length of the live TV buffer on most S1 and S2 TiVos from the default 30 minutes to a range of alternate values between 15 minutes and three hours. This comprises both a tcl executable file and an itcl extension to Portland Paw's Hackman module for Tivoweb.
CALLER ID RSS Feed	Creates an RSS feed of recent calls; tested with Firefox, IE 7.0, FreePOPs and many other feedreaders. Item links provide reverse-phone number lookup. Version 2.0 works with TivoWebPlus 2.0, and can read call logs generated by elseed and ncid.
Channel Grid	Allows the user to see a single channel's programming data for a week.
Channel Prefs	Allows the user to display and manipulate current values of the Favorite and Receive flag for each channel. (requires TWP 1.1 or later)
Conflict Resolve with Two TiVos	Shows users unresolved conflicts, then discovers if a second networked TiVo is available to record them.
DailyMail Jazz	A module and tcl file that sends users a daily email from their TiVo on its status including system temperature and last successful phone call time and date plus all recent and scheduled future recordings (including Suggestions) and notification of any future recording conflicts.
Digiguide EPG Data Comparison	Compares the current TiVo guide data and To Do list for the UK Series 1 Thomson TiVo with EPG data sourced from the PC Digiguide Application, or over the web from http://www.mydigiguide.com (Thomson PVR10UK S1 TiVo models only).
Digiguide Search	A module to schedule recordings by right-clicking in the Digiguide PC app (Needs subbed TiVo, UK only)
Display Text	A TivoWeb module that will display text on the TiVo screen. Text to be displayed may be entered interactively from a PC web browser. May be useful if the older version does not work. Another version with colour bar selector.
Edit Startup Script	Easy editing of the boot up script
Endpad	This module created by Sanderton and now maintained by Maxwells_Daemon intelligently adds soft padding to all specified recordings on the TiVo so that users do not miss the start or end of their favourite TV programs if they start early or overrun.
Edit TiVo Menus	Change the text of all menus on the TiVo itself - E.g. TiVo Central to "Joe's TiVo Central" - Useful when users have more than one TiVo, or just want to change the text.
Elseed CALLER ID shortcut module	Quick TivoWeb module to show Caller ID log button in TWP. Must have ELSEED running already.
Global Blocklist	Module to pre-select items in the TivoWeb To-Do list for deletion based on titles or episode descriptions. Can be used as a work-around for the lack of NOT logic in Advanced Wishlists.
Guide Data Checker	Checks that guide data is present for each channel; check for rogue/orphaned Season Pass series.
Hackman	A TiVo Hack Manager plug-in module for TivoWeb and TivoWebPlus that allows the user to start and stop TiVo hacks, such as telnet, tivoftp, TiVo Control Station, cron, YAC, etc. Includes remote reboot capabilities and the ability to execute bash command lines. Also edits rc.sysinit and secondary startup files, such as rc.sysinit.author. Version 2.0.0 update includes support for xPlusz commands and backdoor codes as well as incorporating JJBliss's bufferhack, KeepUpTo and TCTimout utilities. Hackman also provides protection against reboot cycling caused by corrupted guide data.
HiGuide	A grid based guide with highlighting
Highlights	Displays recommended shows in the next week and provides a link to record. The current version of the module allows users to preview and record Radio Times TV recommendations, Radio Times radio recommendations, DigiGuide TV recommendations and film recommendations
Install	A script that makes it much easier to install hacks - no more download/extract/ftp to TiVo. Users simply type "install <hack>" on the TiVo, or use the tivoweb module.
iTivoweb	Module for Tivoweb to provide access to several TiVo functions from an iPhone. Mainly for UK (series 1) TiVos.
JPEG Display	Show JPEG images on the TiVo screen
LJ's Tivoweb Modules	A series of modules by LJ extending the functionality of Wishlists, Now Playing and the User Interface in Tivoweb v1.9.4 and especially oriented towards UK Series 1 TiVos running TiVo software version 2.5.5
Load Extra Logos For Now Playing	A module for Tivoweb that manages the additional channel logos that can be loaded onto any UK or US Series 1 TiVo. Logos can be added for any channel for which the user may currently have or is likely in future to have programs listed in Now Playing and the UK logo set is maintained by Tivocommunity forum member aerialplug and can be downloaded from http://hywel.underground-history.co.uk/tivo/logos/
Manage NoReRecord List	Maintains TiVo's NoReRecord list. This list is used to prevent automatic recording of shows within 30 days of their deletion or cancellation from the TiVo.
Manual Recording	Set manual recordings
Merge Recordings	Merge multiple recordings for a single "Save to VCR" operation.
Movie Search	This program allows users to easily browse upcoming movies for their TiVo. Allows browsing by category, premiere, keyword all movies that are playing on the movie channels of their choice
MP3 Player	Plays MP3s locally on the TiVo
New Episodes	Shows the programmes in the schedule where the original air date is the same as the broadcast date, i.e. they are new episodes.
No red dots (LJ's version)	Sends the backup key every 60 seconds if a recording is in progress
No red dots or missed channel changes irblast	, inspired by LJs noreddot program, runs on the TiVo in the background and can send infrared signals to external set top boxes based on the current channel, recording state and system state.
Now Playing with Sort and Folders	Adds Folders and Sorting to the Now Playing module
Now Playing with Sort for version 2.5.5 TiVos	This module allows us 2.5.5 TiVo users to sort Now Playing by Classic, Expiry Date, Title, Title + Episode Title, Duration and Genre.
Now playing with search & tivo playback	Lets the user sort and search programmes through tivoweb for playback on the TiVo screen. Useful when users have many pages of recordings in now playing.
Remap Channel Numbers	Allows users to change TiVos channel numbers
Re-Order Season Passes	Allows user to change the priorities of Season passes, as in the SP Manager on the TiVo
RunScript	A TivoWeb module with CGI-like abilities to run bash scripts (or any exec) and pass parameters.
Schedule	Shows in calendar format all upcoming "to-do" items and programs that are in the user's "now showing list". The user can navigate to previous and coming weeks by click forward and back arrows.
Search Advisory Codes	This module allows users to search by Advisory Code.
Set manual recordings from Digiguide	Set a manual recording by right-clicking in the Digiguide PC app (UK only)
Show conflicts for a series	These changes will show users an icon against each showing in a series letting them know whether their TiVo is already planning to record something in that slot.
Showcase	Shows the Inside TiVo and Channel Highlights screens in your browser.
SortNP	A tcl utility from mikerr for the UK Series 1 TiVo that can also be set to launch on boot using Sanderton's Startup Editor module. This adds a new menu and functionality to Now Playing to both let users add episode titles to the listings and also to sort the listings alphabetically or by program size. The utility can also group all programs in a series into a single program folder within Now Playing.
Startup Editor	Sanderton's module allows users to edit the rc.sysinit.author.edit TiVo startup file directly from within Tivoweb.
Statistics	Show a TagCloud with statistics of users' most popular actors and actresses - based on their recording history.
TiVoTokens	Send programme suggestions to users' friends
Tracker Tracker (AltEPG update)	A Tivoweb 1.9.4 only compatible Module that allows users to keep track of all episodes of programs that they have previously recorded so that the 28-day No Re-Record rule can be extended indefinitely, thus ensuring that episodes of programs they have previously recorded are not recorded again by their TiVo. The data in this module also interfaces with the To Do list section of the daily email sent by DailyMailJazz. Updated throughout 2011 for the AltEPG.
TV Listings Grid	Displays upcoming listings in a grid format. Latest version is Grid 1.04 and can be found here.
Unofficial update	Update includes filters, SC and RP. (Note this unofficial update to Search by A/C does not work on the UK model Thomson TiVo Series 1 PVR10UK as the UK program listings compiled and supplied by Tribune do not support the RC and SP codes)
WAP	A re-write of TivoWeb itself to give access via WAP.
What's On	This module is based on the Browse by Time screen on the TiVo. This TivoWeb version also allows users to press a button to watch a programme if it is currently on and will show them if future programmes conflict with programmes currently scheduled to be recorded.
xTivoweb	Module for Tivoweb which generates XHTML-MP pages giving mobile devices like cellphones, PDAs, etc. access to TiVo functions. For UK TiVos.

== See also ==
- TiVo
- TiVo DVRs
