= DigitalOptics Corporation =

IT Company

- Company type: Private
- Industry: Mobile imaging
- Headquarters: San Jose, California
- Key people: John Thode, President
- Products: MEMS-based camera modules, embedded image processing software, micro-optics
- Parent: Xperi
- Website: www.doc.com

DigitalOptics Corporation (DOC) is a San Jose, California-based technology company that designs and manufactures imaging systems for smartphones. DOC’s capabilities include optical design, camera module design and manufacturing, MEMS manufacturing, and image processing algorithms.

In 2013, DOC introduced a camera module technology ( mems|cam) with a MEMS-based autofocus actuator. The technology is designed to replace voice coil motor components, while improving speed, power consumption, and precision of the autofocus function.

DigitialOptics also provides embedded image processing and computational photography algorithms, including its face beautification, face detection, and multi-focus products.

DigitalOptics Corporation operates as a wholly owned subsidiary of Xperi. DOC consists of the imaging and optics-related businesses acquired by Xperi. since 2005.

== History ==
- 1991 Digital Optics Corporation was founded out of the University of North Carolina at Charlotte to develop micro-optics
- 2005 Tessera Technologies, Inc. acquires assets of Shellcase for image sensor packaging technology
- 2006 Digital Optics Corporation acquired by Tessera Technologies, Inc.
- 2007 Tessera Technologies, Inc. acquires EyeSquad, a developer of digital auto-focus and optical zoom solutions for camera modules
- 2008 Tessera Technologies, Inc. acquires Fotonation, provider of embedded imaging solutions
- 2008 Siimpel commences production of MEMS autofocus for Motorola handsets
- 2009 Tessera Technologies, Inc. acquires Israel-based Dblur Technologies, a developer of software lens technology
- 2010 Tessera Technologies, Inc. acquires Siimpel Corporation, a developer of MEMS-based camera solutions
- 2012 DigitalOptics to acquire assets of Vista Point camera module business from Flextronics
- 2013 DigitalOptics launches mems|cam product
