= VTap =

Video search engine

- Logo in 2011
- Website type: Video search engine
- Registration: Optional
- Launched: 10 September 2007
- Current status: Defunct

VTap was a mobile-focused video search engine created by the U.S. software company Veveo. It launched in 2007 with an emphasis on fast, predictive search for videos and other quick-answer lookups on smartphones.

== History ==
Veveo began developing the technology behind vTap about two and a half years before launch and raised US$28 million in venture funding prior to release. VentureBeat reported that vTap would debut on September 10, 2007, initially supporting Windows Mobile with an Ajax web app for the iPhone and broader J2ME support to follow.

== Technology ==
vTap emphasized speed and mobile ergonomics. According to contemporaneous coverage, the service used character-by-character predictive indexing and could also provide quick answers from sources such as Wikipedia.

== Aftermath ==
Veveo later focused on licensing its search and discovery technology to device makers and pay-TV operators. In February 2014, Rovi Corporation announced an agreement to acquire Veveo for approximately US$62 million in cash plus up to US$7 million in milestones, stating it would combine Veveo’s personalization and semantic search with Rovi’s metadata and recommendation engine. Following the acquisition, vTap did not continue as a stand-alone consumer service. Veveo’s technology was integrated into Rovi’s search, recommendation, and metadata offerings.

== See also ==
- Veveo
- Video search engine
