= Digital terminal adapter =

A Digital transport/terminal adapter (or DTA) is a device used by cable companies who are switching to all-digital cable systems. They typically have an RF input for receiving service, and a modulated output on Channel 3 or 4 that allows a TV to be set to channel 3 or 4 and have the tuner change channels. They are also deployed by cable companies who are encrypting digital signals to cut down on cable theft.

These devices go under several names, such as Digital Terminal Adapter, Digital Transport Adapter, or Digital Adapter. They generally do not offer pay-per-view or DVR support, but Rovi (formerly Macrovision) is deploying an on-screen guide that would allow subscribers to see what is on TV at the moment. Digital adapters are intended for rooms with less used TVs or for basic cable subscribers.

== History ==
As part of Comcast Project Cavalry (also referred to as the Digital Migration), all customers starting in 2009 who subscribed to expanded cable would need a DTA device or traditional cable box to keep viewing affected channels. Project Cavalry was intended to clear bandwidth for DOCSIS 3.0 services including faster internet, and additional HD programming. Since 2012–2014, all channels on Comcast-operated cable systems are encrypted to prevent theft of service.

Launching DTAs and decryption devices with embedded security and not relying on a device such as CableCARD became problematic, as the FCC banned integrated security from cable tuners in 2007. Eventually, the cable companies overcame this and launched the digital adapters.

Comcast has since introduced the XiD set-top box with the same form factor as the original DTA design but adds an HDMI output and access to X1 DVRs and channels via its digital cable and IP tuning abilities. In 2012, an HD-DTA was launched adding an HDMI connection and RF remote support to the original DTA design.

Other cable operators including Cox, Mediacom, and several others have since adopted the digital adapter technology that Comcast pioneered in 2009.
