= Trymedia =

Trymedia Systems, Inc. is a division of RealNetworks that provides digital distribution services based on its proprietary ActiveMARK DRM and digital distribution technology. Trymedia is headquartered in San Francisco, with offices in Berkshire and Alicante.

== Overview ==
Trymedia was founded in 1999 as Trymedia Systems, Inc. by cousins Alex Torrubia and Andres Torrubia. The company was launched in Spain and, after a round of fund-raising in New York, relocated to San Francisco. Macrovision acquired Trymedia for US$34 million on July 26, 2005. With the acquisition, Macrovision launched a new games division, Trymedia Games Division, based around Trymedia employees. Trymedia was not a profitable operation, losing $14.5 million on revenue of just over $9 million in 2007. On February 22, 2008, RealNetworks announced it had acquired Trymedia from Macrovision for an undisclosed sum, reported in a Macrovision conference call to be $4million.

Trymedia operates an online network of digitally distributed computer games. The network is integrated into Microsoft's digital locker service, and provides white label online retail services to affiliates such as Electronics Boutique and GameSpot.

=== ActiveMARK ===
ActiveMARK is a technology suite of Trymedia for secure digital distribution. It provides DRM protection for software distributed digitally or by CDs/DVD, along with commerce, distribution, administration, and marketing services.

=== Trygames ===
Trygames, a division of Trymedia, was a retail website offering computer games from the Trymedia Games network for download, trial, and purchase. It was launched in 2001. The Trygames website was closed and redirected to the GameHouse website in 2014.

== See also ==
- TiVo Corporation
