= TiVo Inc. v. EchoStar Corp. =

Legal case stretching from 2004 to 2011

- Court: United States Court of Appeals for the Federal Circuit
- Full case name: TiVo Inc. v. EchoStar Corporation, EchoStar Dbs Corporation, EchoStar Technologies Corporation, EchoSphere Limited Liability Company, EchoStar Satellite LLC, and Dish Network Corporation
- Decided: April 20, 2011
- Citations: 646 F.3d 869; 98 U.S.P.Q.2d 1413

Case history
- Prior history: 516 F.3d 1290 (Fed. Cir. 2008); 640 F. Supp. 2d 853 (E.D. Tex. 2009); 655 F. Supp. 2d 661 (E.D. Tex. 2009); 597 F.3d 1247 (Fed. Cir. 2010)

Court membership
- Judges sitting: William Curtis Bryson, Timothy B. Dyk, Arthur J. Gajarsa, Richard Linn, Alan David Lourie, Haldane Robert Mayer, Kimberly Ann Moore, Pauline Newman, Kathleen M. O'Malley, Sharon Prost, Randall Ray Rader, Jimmie V. Reyna (en banc)

Case opinions
- Majority: Lourie, joined by Newman, Mayer, Bryson, Moore, O'Malley, Reyna
- Concur/dissent: Dyk, joined by Rader, Gajarsa, Linn, Prost

TiVo Inc. v. EchoStar Corp. is a case stretching from 2004 to 2011, which took place in the United States District Court for the Eastern District of Texas and the United States Court of Appeals for the Federal Circuit. TiVo Inc. sued EchoStar Corp. claiming patent infringement of a DVR technology. The issues addressed during litigation included patent infringement, wording of injunctions, infringing product redesign, contempt of court orders, and contempt sanctions. Ultimately, the court held that EchoStar Corp. had indeed infringed TiVo Inc's patent and was in contempt of court for noncompliance of an injunction. The parties reached a settlement wherein EchoStar Corp. paid TiVo Inc. a licensing fee. Further, the court replaced the established contempt test with a single step test. The simplified test makes it more difficult for patent holders to prove contempt as a result of repeat infringement.

== Overview ==
In 2004, TiVo Inc. sued the consortium of companies known as EchoStar Corp. (EchoStar Communications Corporation, EchoStar DBS Corporation, EchoStar Technologies Corporation, Echosphere Limited Liability Company, and EchoStar Satellite LLC, and Dish Network Corporation) in the United States District Court for the Eastern District of Texas alleging they infringed various claims of the "Multimedia Time Warping System" patent (U.S. Patent 6,233,389 or '389 patent) with their line of competing digital video recorders (DVRs). It is referred to as the "time warp" patent.

As described in U.S. Patent 6,233,389, TiVo claims a system for parsing real-time television metadata in an external ASIC. TiVo's system either uses the metadata embedded in an MPEG2 transport stream or generates similar metadata for analog broadcasts using the information provided by North American Broadcast Teletext Standard. The metadata is used to determine when specific events occur. Saving the event log makes it possible for the TiVo system to perform the following operations: "reverse, fast forward, play, pause, index, fast/slow reverse play, and fast/slow play." One novel aspect of TiVo's '389 patent is the ASIC implementation. By dedicating a specialized processing unit to event detection, the application processor can be used for other tasks. TiVo's patent refers to their event coprocessor as the "MediaSwitch."

A jury found EchoStar Corp's products infringed TiVo Inc's patent, resulting in the court issuing a permanent injunction against EchoStar Corp.

EchoStar Corp. appealed the judgment to the United States Court of Appeals for the Federal Circuit. Upon review, the Federal Circuit reversed the judgment of infringement due to the hardware claims; however, the court affirmed the judgment of infringement due to the software claims. The District Court's permanent injunction, stayed during the appeal proceeding, was placed back into effect.

Soon after the appeal concluded, TiVo Inc. motioned to hold EchoStar Corp in contempt of the permanent injunction. The District Court utilized the two-part test for patent infringement established in KSM Fastening Systems, Inc. V. H.A. Jones Company, Inc. The crux of this test involved determining whether there is "more than a colorable difference" between the original infringing product and the redesign. EchoStar claimed significant changes to their DVR system in order to be compliant with the ruling. The key changes to the system were replacing the infringing event detection system with "start code detection was replaced by statistical estimation, a method which EchoStar characterized as an indexless system and a brute-force search method." The court determined that EchoStar Corp's software redesign still infringed TiVo Inc. '389 patent; thus, EchoStar was held in contempt of the Infringement Provision of the permanent injunction.

Furthermore, the District Court held that EchoStar Corp never complied with the Disablement Provision of the permanent injunction. Therefore, EchoStar Corp was held in contempt and sanctioned.

EchoStar Corp. appealed the judgment of contempt to the Federal Circuit. The court was unmoved by EchoStar Corp's arguments and affirmed the District Court's judgment with a 2–1 ruling, EchoStar then motioned for a rehearing en banc. Upon review, the en banc Federal Circuit determined the KSM test was unworkable and instituted a new test for post-infringement contempt proceedings. The en banc Federal Circuit vacated and remanded the judgment on the Infringement Provision of the permanent injunction. However, the judgment of contempt with respect to the violation of the Disablement Provision was affirmed. Thus, EchoStar was held to be in contempt of the permanent injunction with a 7–5 ruling.

On April 29, 2011, the companies reached a $500 million settlement whereby EchoStar Corp. agreed to license DVR technology from TiVo Inc. In addition, all pending litigation was to be dismissed with prejudice and all injunctions dissolved. However, the en banc Federal Circuit appeal was not dismissed because a decision was reached before the settlement. Consequently, the parties were "free upon remand…to request that the District Court dismiss the complaint and vacate its previously imposed sanctions" due to the settlement.

== Timeline ==
TiVo Inc. v. EchoStar Corp. stretched from January 2004 to April 2011, the timeline of events is very complex. Presented below is a rough outline of the major events during the legal proceedings (table adapted from).

Date	Event
January 2004	TiVo files complaint against EchoStar for infringement of U.S. Patent 6,233,389.
April 2006	Jury finds EchoStar guilty of patent infringement.
August 2006	Judge declares EchoStar caused irreparable harm to TiVo and issues an injunction requiring EchoStar to disable their infringing DVRs.
October 2006	EchoStar appeals district court ruling and is awarded a stay.
November 2007	US Patent Office reexamines US Patent 6,233,389 and confirms all claims.
January 2008	US Court of Appeals affirms district court's ruling.
April 2008	Federal Circuit denies EchoStar's request for en banc review.
May 2008	EchoStar defends workaround for infringing technology in status conference at trial court.
October 2008	U.S. Supreme Court rejects hearing TiVo Inc. v. EchoStar Corp.
November 2008	US Patent Office agrees to reexamine US Patent 6,233,389.
February 2009	Three-day hearing to determine if EchoStar's current workaround is compliant with U.S. Patent 6,233,389.
June 2009	Trial judge concludes EchoStar is still infringing and awards TiVo $103 million in damages.
September 2009	Trial judge awards TiVo an additional $200 million in damages due to EchoStar's continued infringement.
March 2010	Federal Circuit rejects EchoStar's appeal and upholds settlement.
May 2010	EchoStar granted en banc review by the Federal Circuit.
October 2010	US Patent Office confirms all claims in US Patent 6,233,389 for a second time.
November 2010	En banc review
April 2011	TiVo awarded $500 million settlement. EchoStar agrees to license TiVo's DVR technology.

== Opinion details ==
=== TiVo Inc. v. EchoStar Corp., United States District Court for the Eastern District of Texas ===
In a trial by jury, EchoStar was found to infringe TiVo Inc's '389 patent. The infringing devices were the categorized by their video decoding ASIC. The two categories were DVRs using the 50X series ASIC and DVRs using Broadcom Corporation parts. The jury found, "the 50X DVRs literally infringed the asserted hardware and software claims," the "Broadcom DVRs literally infringed the asserted hardware claims and infringed the asserted software claims under the doctrine of equivalents." As a result, TiVo Inc. was awarded approximately $74 million in damages from lost profits and royalties, and a permanent injunction was issued against EchoStar.

=== TiVo Inc. v. EchoStar Corp., No. 2006-1574 (Fed. Cir., January 31, 2008) ===
Before: Circuit Judge Bryson, Senior Circuit Judge Plager, and Chief District Judge Keeley

EchoStar Corp. motioned the Federal Circuit for an appeal and was granted a temporary stay on the permanent injunction. The issues on trial were two hardware claims (1 and 32) and two software claims (31 and 61) of TiVo Inc.'s '389 patent. The Federal Circuit held "Broadcom DVRs do not satisfy the 'is separated' limitation [of the hardware claims] and the 50X DVRs don't satisfy the 'assembles' limitation [of the hardware claims];" thus, the appeals court reversed "the portion of the judgment upholding the jury's verdict that EchoStar's DVRs literally infringe the hardware claims." Finding the jury's reasoning permissible, the Federal Circuit upheld the jury's verdict that EchoStar Corp's DVRs infringed the software claims of TiVo Inc.'s '389 patent. The stay on the permanent injunction dissolved when the appeal became final and the District Court could determine if TiVo Inc. sustained additional damages while the stay was in effect. Additional damages were found to be warranted.

=== TiVo Inc. v. Dish Network Corp., Civil Action No. 2:04-CV-01 (E.D. Tex., June 2, 2009) ===
TiVo Inc. motioned to hold EchoStar Corp. in contempt for violating the Infringement and Disablement Provisions of the permanent injunction. The District Court utilized the KSM test to determine if a contempt proceeding was appropriate and if there was continuing infringement. The first step of the KSM test was to determine whether there was a "colorable" difference between the infringing and modified products. The second step was to compare the modified products to the patent claims to determine if the modified product infringes.

EchoStar argued that its redesign of the infringing products was more than colorably different by the KSM test. Upon a comparison between the infringing and modified products, the District Court held "any differences between the infringing and modified products are no more than colorable … As a result, contempt proceeding in this case are appropriate [by the KSM test]." Applying the second step of the KSM test, the District Court held "modifications do not affect elements of the disputed claims as construed … the infringing and modified devices may be treated as the same." Therefore, EchoStar Corp. continued to infringe TiVo Inc. patent '389 and was held in contempt of permanent injunction's Infringement Provision.

With respect to the Disablement Provision, the District Court stated "even if EchoStar had achieved a non-infringing design-around, this Court would still find that EchoStar is in contempt of this Court's permanent injunction … [regarding] the Disablement Provision of this Court's order, which ordered EchoStar to 'disable the DVR functionality.'" EchoStar argued the Disablement Provision only covered original infringing products (non-software updated 50X and Broadcom DVRs). However, the District Court held that a plain reading of the order includes all 50X and Broadcom DVRs whether non-infringing redesigned or original infringing. The District Court ordered EchoStar Corps. to deactivate the DVR capability of all 50X and Broadcom DVRs regardless of the software utilized by the device; EchoStar Corps. did not comply and were held in contempt of the Disablement Provision of the permanent injunction.

=== TiVo Inc. v. Dish Network Corp., Civil Action No. 2:04-CV-01 (E.D. Tex., September 4, 2009) ===
This ruling determined the sanctions against EchoStar Corp. for violation the permanent injunction. The District Court awarded TiVo Inc. "$2.25 per DVR subscriber per month for the contempt period," which amounts to nearly $90 million in addition to the original jury award. Furthermore, EchoStar Corp. must reimburse TiVo Inc's legal fees for the contempt proceedings. The District Court amended its earlier injunction to require "EchoStar seek the court's approval before implementing future non-infringing workarounds to its DVR software."

=== TiVo Inc. v. EchoStar Corp., No. 2009-1374 (Fed. Cir., March 4, 2010) ===
Majority Opinion (Circuit Judges Mayer and Lourie)

EchoStar Crop. appealed the District Court's contempt ruling on the grounds that issues relating to continued infringement are impermissible in a contempt proceeding due to changes made during the redesign. The Federal Circuit disagreed and held that the District Court "used the proper standard in its analysis," the KSM test. The Federal Circuit concluded there was no "abuse of discretion in the court's decision to hold contempt proceedings," In addition, the Federal Circuit was persuaded that the District Court could find EchoStar in contempt of the Infringement Provision and that there was "clear and convincing evidence" to do so. With regards to the Disablement Provision, the Federal Circuit held a plain reading "would have provided EchoStar with notice of what is now being held in contempt;" furthermore, the chance to appeal the provision language has passed. The amendment to the permanent injunction which required EchoStar Crop. to seek pre-approval for any new design-around effort was affirmed.

Dissenting Opinion (Circuit Judge Rader)

Indeed, the only thing that is not different [about this case] is the identity of the parties themselves. These differences deserve a trial, not a summary contempt proceeding.

— Circuit Judge Rader

Judge Rader argued the District Court's injunction was too broad and ambiguously worded. Furthermore, the dissenting opinion argued "TiVo should not be able to bootstrap its new, previously abandoned infringement theory to that [previous] verdict," because this "discourages good faith efforts to design around an infringement verdict."

=== TiVo Inc. v. EchoStar Corp., No. 2009-1374 (Fed. Cir. April 20, 2011) (en banc) ===
Majority Opinion (Circuit Judges Lourie, Newman, Mayer, Bryson, Moore, O'Malley, and Reyna; In Part Chief Circuit Judge Rader, Circuit Judges Gajarsa, Linn, Dyk, and Prost)

EchoStar Corp. petitioned for a rehearing en banc by the Federal Circuit to challenge "the enforceability of the District Court's injunction based on overbreadth and vagueness." Upon review, the en banc Federal Circuit overruled the case which the KSM test was from, "we conclude that KSM's two-step inquiry has been unworkable and now overrule that holding of KSM." The en banc Federal Circuit replaced the KSM test with a straight "more than colorable difference test." As a result of the application of the new test, the en banc Federal Circuit vacated the District Court's finding of contempt for violating the Infringement Provision of the permanent injunction. However, the en banc Federal Circuit affirmed the District Court's holding with regards to the Disablement Provision; thus, affirming the District Court's finding of contempt. The en banc Federal Circuit found EchoStar Corp's arguments for overbreath and vagueness in the permanent injunction "unpersuasive."

The original jury award was vacated; however, the contempt sanctions were affirmed. In addition, the District Court's holding of infringement provision contempt was remanded "to make a finding concerning any colorable difference between the previously adjudicated infringing devices and the newly accused devices" using the new test laid out in this case.

Dissenting Opinion (Chief Circuit Judge Rader; and Circuit Judges Gajarsa, Linn, and Prost)

The dissenting opinion focused on the Disablement Provision of the permanent injunction, which argued that the finding of contempt should have been reversed outright. "In my view, the disablement provision does not bar the installation of modified software that renders the devices non-infringing, and, even if the provision were unclear, an unclear injunction cannot be the basis for contempt." In addition, the dissenting opinion argued this case should not be remanded to the lower court due to the Infringement Provision since "that provision plainly was not violated."

== Precedent established ==
The ruling seems to make it easier to initiate contempt proceedings but harder to prove contempt [for continued infringement].

— Carlos Perez-Albuerne, partner at Choate Hall & Stewart

As a result of the en banc ruling of the Federal Circuit, a new test to determine whether an adjudged infringer can be held in contempt for continued infringement was implemented. This new test replaced the old two-step KSM test from the 1985 decision in KSM Fastening Systems, Inc. V. H.A. Jones Company, Inc. The new test "raised the bar for proving that defendant committed contempt" by requiring that a patentee show "the elements found infringing in the original product without significant change in the redesign." The KSM test required that the original and redesign were "generally similar." In addition, the patentee must "show that the defendant's redesigned product infringes upon the same patent claims as the original product."
