= EMeta =

Company

eMeta Corporation
- Type: Private
- Industry: Software
- Founded: New York City (1998)
- Defunct: 2006; 20 years ago
- Fate: Acquired
- Headquarters: New York City
- Key people: Jonathan Lewin, CEO and Founder; Chris Miranda, Vice President of Sales; Andrei Vazhnov, Chief Technology Officer;
- Products: Access control and ecommerce systems

eMeta Corporation was a company that provided access control, subscription management and ecommerce solutions for media, entertainment and software companies. It was founded in 1998 and headquartered in New York City. eMeta was taken over by Macrovision Corporation in 2006. Macrovision sold the eMeta operations to Atypon in November 2008.

The eMeta suite of software products, consisting of RightAccess and RightCommerce, helps customers like McGraw-Hill, NYTimes.com and Wolters Kluwer license and sell digital assets, including text, audio, video, streaming media, games and software applications (SaaS).

== Products and services ==
=== RightAccess ===
RightAccess is the access control module within the eMeta suite, providing advanced authentication, authorization, administration, registration and licensing functionality for all types of digital goods and services. RightAccess allows companies to manage how customers access online offerings.

=== RightCommerce ===
RightCommerce is the ecommerce module within the eMeta suite, making it easy to market and sell digital products. Designed for complex digital goods billing and subscription management, it allows companies to target customers with free trials, discounts or gift subscriptions – while increasing incremental or add-on purchases with promotions and targeted pricing. Customer care features, including self-care, improve customer satisfaction.

=== eRightsWEB ===
eRightsWEB is the ASP, or software as a service (SaaS), version of the eMeta suite, giving smaller organizations the opportunity to benefit from an access control and ecommerce system.

== Notable customers ==
- Celera Genomics
- CNN.com
- Elsevier
- FT.com
- Hoover's, Inc. (US and UK)
- iVillage.com
- Knight Ridder Digital
- McGraw-Hill Higher Education
- NASCAR.com
- NYTimes.com
- Oxford University Press
- ProQuest Information and Learning
- Reuters
- SmartMoney.com
- Turner
- The Globe and Mail
- Wolters Kluwer
