= TRA, Inc. =

American marketing research company

TRA, Inc
- Company type: Private
- Industry: marketing research
- Founded: February 2008
- Headquarters: New York, New York, USA
- Key people: Mark Lieberman, CEO; Bill Harvey, President

TRA, Inc. (The Right Audience) is a media and marketing measurement company that matches the advertisements households receive with the products they buy. The company is based in New York City and was founded by Mark Lieberman and Bill Harvey in 2008. In July 2012 it was sold to TiVo for a reported $US20 million. Prior to the TiVo sale, TRA's investors included Kodiak Venture Partners, Intel Capital, and Arbitron.

== Products ==
TRA's Media TRAnalytics primary reports for TV may be run by TRA’s clients include:
1. The TRA Television Audience Measurement report (TAM), which gathers second-by-second anonymous census-level television audience measurement matched to census-level household demographics. TAM reports include TRA’s Advertising Media Exposure (AME) Report, Audience Retention (AR) Report and Reach Frequency (RF) Report.
2. TRA’s True Target Index (TTI) Report is used to select program vehicles to carry a brand’s advertising in order to reach the largest percentage of the types of purchasers most likely to respond to sales the largest number of times.
3. TRA’s Return On Investment Report (ROI) Report is used to post-evaluate which elements (targets, creative, networks, dayparts, program types, programs, frequency levels) produced the highest ROI so that the next media plan can allocate more heavily to the most productive elements.

These reports tell advertisers, networks and agencies the relative strengths and weaknesses of different creative executions, and how such variables as program environment, time slots, and pod position impact their ROI.

== Privacy ==
TRA has a patent-pending third-party blind matching solution implemented with TRA’s partners – names and addresses are never received nor seen by TRA. This privacy solution has been vetted by privacy experts in the telecommunications field and by companies whose businesses depend on privacy protection. TRA is one of 65 companies in the U.S. to have obtained ISO/IEC 27001certification, the information security management system standard published by the International Organization for Standardization (ISO) designed to ensure security controls to protect information assets. TRA owns U.S. Patent No. 7,729,940, entitled “Analyzing Return on Investment of Advertising Campaigns by Matching Multiple Data Sources”; U.S. Patent No. 8,000,993, U.S. Patent No. 8,060,398 and U.S. Patent No. 8,112,301, all entitled "Using Consumer Purchase Behavior for Television Targeting.”
