= DataGrail =

American data privacy software company

DataGrail, Inc.
- Type: Private
- Industry: Software
- Founded: 2018
- Founders: Daniel Barber; Ignacio Zendejas; Earl Hathaway
- Headquarters: San Francisco, California, United States
- Area served: Worldwide
- Key people: Daniel Barber (CEO)
- Products: DataGrail Privacy Management Platform
- Number of employees: 150 (2025)
- Website: www.datagrail.io

DataGrail, Inc. is a data privacy software company headquartered in San Francisco. The company develops a privacy management platform that helps businesses comply with regulations such as the GDPR, CCPA, and other global data protection laws.

== Software ==
DataGrail is an information privacy web application developed by DataGrail, Inc. It is designed to support businesses in adhering to privacy regulations such as the GDPR (General Data Protection Regulation), the CCPA (California Consumer Privacy Act), and other global data protection laws.

== History ==
DataGrail, Inc. was founded by Daniel Barber, Ignacio Zendejas, and Earl Hathaway in Palo Alto in 2018.

DataGrail was available on Product Hunt on May 24, 2018. The initial product addressed GDPR requirements for right of access and right to be forgotten requests. In September 2018, DataGrail received $4M in investment from Cloud Apps Capital Partners, with participation from Gunderson Dettmer. In October 2019, Okta signed a partnership and invested in DataGrail. The company then released a second product designed in response to GDPR Article 30 requirements. The method for discovering software systems containing personal data was detailed in a 2020 U.S. patent by Daniel Barber, Ignacio Zendejas, and Earl Hathaway.

In November 2019, American Express made a disclosed investment in the company. In March 2021, DataGrail received $30M in investment from Felicis Ventures and Next47, with participation from DocuSign and HubSpot. At the time, the company counted Databricks, Dexcom, and Twilio among its enterprise customers.

In March 2022, a new funding round led by Third Point Ventures and Thomson Reuters helped the company raise $45 million. At the same time, DataGrail released a third product designed to conduct privacy impact assessments.

In June 2024, DataGrail released a consent management product to address compliance requirements for global privacy regulations. In August 2024, the company held the second DataGrail Summit with speakers from Instacart and Anthropic.

In 2025, the company released its annual Data Privacy Trends Report, which reported a sharp rise in data deletion requests and increasing compliance costs for businesses handling privacy requests.

== Awards and recognition ==
DataGrail has been included in the Forbes and Statista ranking of America’s Best Startup Employers for three consecutive years, from 2024 to 2026.

In March 2025, Fast Company included DataGrail in the Most Innovative Companies category for security. The following month, the company won an SC Award in the category Best Compliance Solution for its DataGrail Consent platform.

That same year, DataGrail was included in Built In’s Best Places to Work awards, receiving recognition as both a Top Remote Startup and a Top San Francisco Startup.

In November 2025, DataGrail was recognized as a Leader in the IDC MarketScape: Worldwide Data Privacy Compliance Software vendor assessment.
