= TiVo Corporation =

American technology company (1983–2020)

- Formerly: Macrovision Solutions Corporation (1983–2009); Rovi Corporation (2009–2016)
- Type: Public
- Traded as: Nasdaq: TIVO
- Industry: Digital entertainment technology; Digital video recorders
- Predecessor: TiVo Inc.
- Founded: 1983; 43 years ago
- Founders: Victor Farrow; John O. Ryan
- Defunct: May 29, 2020; 6 years ago
- Fate: Merged with Xperi
- Successor: Xperi
- Headquarters: San Jose, California, U.S.
- Net income: US$826,456,000 (December 31, 2017)
- Total assets: ▼US$3,163,678,000 (December 31, 2017)
- Number of employees: 1,700+ (2017)
- Website: tivo.com

TiVo Corporation, formerly known as the Rovi Corporation and Macrovision Solutions Corporation, was an American technology company headquartered in San Jose, California. Now operating as Xperi, the company is primarily involved in licensing its intellectual property within the consumer electronics industry, including digital rights management, electronic program guide software, and metadata. The company holds over 6,000 pending and registered patents. The company also provides analytics and recommendation platforms for the video industry.

In 2016, Rovi acquired digital video recorder maker TiVo Inc., and renamed itself TiVo Corporation. On May 30, 2019, TiVo announced the appointment of Dave Shull as the company's new president and CEO.

On December 19, 2019, TiVo merged with Xperi; the combined firm operates as Xperi.

== History ==
=== As Macrovision ===
Macrovision Corporation logo

Macrovision Corporation was established in 1983 by Victor Farrow and John O. Ryan. The 1984 film The Cotton Club was the first video to be encoded with Macrovision technology when it was released in 1985. The technology was subsequently extended to DVD players and other consumer electronic recording and playback devices such as digital cable and satellite set-top boxes, digital video recorders, and portable media players. By the end of the 1980s, most major Hollywood studios were utilizing their services.

In the 1990s, Macrovision acquired companies with expertise in managing access control and secure distribution of other forms of digital media, including music, video games, internet content, and computer software.

Ryan (founder and CEO of Macrovision from June 1995 to October 2001) and William A. Krepick (president of Macrovision Corporation from July 1995 to July 2005 and CEO from October 2001 to July 2005) led the company through an IPO in 1997 priced at $9.00 a share. Under their leadership, the company went from a private company with sales of under $20 million to a global, publicly traded corporation with annual sales of $220 million and market cap exceeding $1 billion.

In July 2005, the company hired Alfred J. Amoroso as chief executive officer and president to succeed William A. Krepick, who announced his retirement earlier in the year.

Macrovision acquired Gemstar-TV Guide on May 2, 2008, in a cash-and-stock deal worth about $2.8 billion. The combined company would seek to be “the homepage for the TV experience,” said Mr. Amoroso.

After the announcement of its intent to buy Gemstar-TV Guide, Macrovision made other changes in order to focus on entertainment technology, including selling its software business unit, valued at approximately $200 million, to private equity firm Thoma Cressey Bravo. The divestiture of the software business unit closed on April 1, 2008, becoming Acresso Software. Macrovision also ultimately sold off parts of Gemstar-TV Guide not focused on digital entertainment, including TryMedia, eMeta, TV Guide Magazine, TV Guide Network and the TV Games Network.

The company also bought two companies providing entertainment metadata: All Media Guide on November 6, 2007, and substantially all the assets of Muze, Inc. on April 15, 2009.

=== As Rovi ===
Rovi Corporation logo

On July 16, 2009, Macrovision Solutions Corporation announced the official change of its name to Rovi Corporation.

Rovi announced its first product on January 7, 2010 – TotalGuide, an interactive media guide that incorporated entertainment data, to search, browse and provide recommendations. On March 16, 2010, Rovi acquired MediaUnbound for an undisclosed amount. MediaUnbound had helped build static and dynamic personalization and recommendation engines for clients such as Napster, eMusic and MTV Networks. On June 16, 2010, the company announced the Rovi Advertising Network which bundled guide advertising and third-party interactive TV platforms.

On December 23, 2010, the company announced its intention to acquire Sonic Solutions and its DivX video software in a deal valued at $720 million. Sonic provided digital video processing, playback and distribution technologies and owned RoxioNow (formerly CinemaNow) an OTT technology provider.

On March 1, 2011, Rovi announced its acquisition of online video guide SideReel.

The company announced Amoroso's intention to retire on May 26, 2011. Tom Carson, formerly the executive vice president of sales and marketing, was appointed CEO and President in December 2011. Under Carson the company shifted its focus on "growth opportunities related to its core enabling technology and services" and it announced that it intended to sell the Rovi Entertainment Store business. It entered into separate agreements to sell the Rovi Entertainment Store to Reliance Majestic Holdings, a private equity-backed company; and its consumer websites to All Media Networks, a new company, in July 2013. Continuing on this path, the company made a similar announcement in January 2014 indicating its intent to sell the DivX and MainConcept businesses.

On April 1, 2013, Rovi acquired Integral Reach, a provider of predictive analysis services. The technology would be integrated into Rovi's audience analysis services.

In April 2013, Facebook began licensing Rovi metadata for use within the service.

=== As TiVo Corporation ===
On April 29, 2016, Rovi Corporation announced that it had acquired TiVo Inc. for $1.1 billion. The combined company operated under the TiVo brand, and held over 6,000 pending and registered patents. Rovi plans to discontinue in-house hardware production, and focus primarily on licensing its technologies and the TiVo brand to third-party companies.

In December 2019, TiVo Corporation announced their intent to merge with Xperi. The surviving entity will operate under the Xperi name and have a combined value of $3 billion. TiVo had previously considered splitting out its hardware operations from its licensing operations. The merger was completed on June 1, 2020.

In August 2022, TiVo announced the TiVo OS for smart TVs launching in 2023 in Europe with Vestel.

== Products ==
=== Guides ===
Rovi provides guides for service providers and CE manufacturers.

- TotalGuide xD, a white-label media guide for mobile devices for finding, managing, and watching TV shows and movies. This also controlled the set top boxes.
- TotalGuide CE, a media guide for CE manufacturers that gives access to broadcast programming, premium over-the-top (OTT) entertainment, and catch-up TV
- Passport Guide and i-Guide, interactive program guides for service providers
- G-Guide, an HTML5-based program guide for digital terrestrial, broadcast satellite, and commercial satellite services
- TotalTV, an online guide enabling websites for news and entertainment organizations to incorporate local TV listings
- Rovi DTA Guide, an interactive program guide designed for households installed with Digital terminal adapters

=== Data ===
Rovi provides entertainment metadata for consumer electronics manufacturers, service providers, retailers, online portals and application developers around the world. The company has over 50 years of metadata for video, music, books, and games covering more than 5 million movies and TV programs, 3.2 million album releases and 30 million song tracks, 9 million in-print and out-of-print book titles, and 70,000 video games. The metadata includes basic facts, local TV listings and channel line-ups for interactive program guides, original editorial, imagery, and other features.

=== Search and recommendations ===
Rovi Search Service allows consumer electronics manufacturers, service providers, and developers to provide solutions that enable consumers to search for and access desired content. Rovi Recommendations Service is a cloud-based service that offers consumers entertainment choices similar to their chosen program, movie, album, track, musician or band.

=== Advertising ===
Rovi Advertising Service enables the monetization of entertainment platforms. It places ads that appear as content choices in application menus and user interfaces for set-top boxes, connected TVs, smartphones, tablets, Blu-ray players, game consoles and other devices.

=== Rovi Audience Management ===
Rovi Audience Management is a suite of products (Advertising Optimizer and Promotion Optimizer) combining big data with predictive analytics to provide TV audience insights and advertising campaign management. Ad Optimizer allows provides campaign management and media planning capabilities to TV networks and multichannel video programming distributors (MVPDs). Promo Optimizer uses past viewing data to enable cable and broadcast networks to create plans for on-air promos.

== Legacy products ==
The company historically developed technologies and products that helped protect content from being pirated. Its two core legacy products were called RipGuard and the Analog Protection System (APS).

=== RipGuard ===
Macrovision introduced its RipGuard technology in February 2005. It was designed to prevent or reduce digital DVD copying by altering the format of the DVD content to disrupt the ripping software. Although the technology could be circumvented by several current DVD rippers such as AnyDVD or DVDFab, Macrovision claimed that 95% of casual users lack the knowledge and/or determination to be able to copy a DVD with RipGuard technology.

=== Analog Protection System ===
The Analog Protection System (APS), also known as Analog Copy Protection (ACP) or Macrovision, was the Macrovision Corporation's flagship product, a copy protection system for both VHS and DVD. Video tapes copied from DVDs encoded with APS become garbled and unwatchable. The process works by adding pulses to analog video signals to negatively impact the AGC circuit of a recording device. In digital devices, changes to the analog video signal are created by a chip that converts the digital video to analog within the device. In DVD players, trigger bits are created during DVD authoring to inform the APS that it should be applied to DVD players' analog outputs or analog video outputs on a PC while playing back a protected DVD-Video disc. In set top boxes trigger bits are incorporated into Conditional Access Entitlement Control Messages (ECM) in the stream delivered to the STB. In VHS, alterations to the analog video signal are added in a Macrovision-provided "processor box" used by duplicators.

=== As Macrovision ===
- In 2000, Macrovision acquired Globetrotter, creators of the FLEXlm, which was subsequently renamed Flexnet.
- In 2002, Macrovision acquired Israeli company Midbar Technologies, developers of the Cactus Data Shield music copy protection solution for $17 million. Additionally the same year, Macrovision acquired all the music copy protection and digital rights management (DRM) assets of TTR Technologies (formerly NASDAQ listed under the ticker TTRE).
- In 2004, Macrovision acquired InstallShield, creators of installation authoring software (later divested to private equity).
- In 2005, Macrovision acquired the intellectual property rights to DVD Decrypter from its developer.
- In 2005, Macrovision acquired ZeroG Software, creators of InstallAnywhere (direct competition to InstallShield MP (MultiPlatform)), and Trymedia Systems.
- In 2006, Macrovision acquired eMeta.
- On January 1, 2007, Macrovision acquired Mediabolic, Inc.
- On November 6, 2007, Macrovision announced its intention to acquire All Media Guide.
- On December 7, 2007, Macrovision announced an agreement to acquire Gemstar-TV Guide and completed the purchase on August 5, 2008.
- On December 19, 2007, Macrovision purchased BD+ DRM technology from Cryptography Research, Inc.
- On April 15, 2009, Macrovision announced that it has acquired substantially all of the assets of Muze, Inc.

=== As Rovi ===
- On March 16, 2010, Rovi acquired Recommendations Service MediaUnbound.
- On December 23, 2010, Rovi announced its intention to acquire Sonic Solutions.
- On March 1, 2011, Rovi acquired SideReel.
- On May 5, 2011, Rovi acquired DigiForge.
- In 2012, Rovi acquired Snapstick.
- In February 2012, Rovi sold Roxio to Corel.
- On April 1, 2013, Rovi acquired Integral Reach.
- On February 25, 2014, Rovi acquired Veveo.
- On November 3, 2014, Rovi acquired Fanhattan, a company that ran the Fan TV service, and owners of The Movie Database, for $12.0 million in cash.
- On April 29, 2016, Rovi confirmed that it would acquire TiVo for approximately $1.1 billion.

== See also ==
- TiVo digital video recorders
- DCS Copy Protection
- Automatic content recognition
- Tivoization

== Additional sources ==
- Fil's FAQ-Link-In Corner: MacroVision FAQ
- MPAA | DVD Frequently Asked Questions
- Columbia ISA: Macrovision Details
- Macrovision Agrees to Sell Software Unit (expired link)
- Realnetworks Acquires Game Distributor From Macrovision
- Adobe LM Service – Adobelmsvc.exe – Program Information (archive)
- Rovi Acquires DigiForge
- Rovi Corporation Appoints Thomas Carson as President and Chief Executive Officer
