= Metapress =

American digital content publishing company

Metapress, Inc.
- Website type: Private company
- Headquarters: United States
- Area served: Worldwide
- Key people: Alex Jasin (CEO)
- Industry: Electronic publishing
- Current status: Defunct, acquired by Atypon

Metapress was a digital content publishing company that produced and distributed online content on a wide array of subjects. Its website said, "We work to integrate content, community and commerce across a number of categories, providing people with actionable advice to achieve greater insights into the subjects they find most interesting." It further said it is a "resource of expert content on the internet". It also created, managed, monetized, and distributed published resources. As of September 24, 2019 it is no longer active.

== See also ==
- List of online magazines
- Online newspaper
- Content marketing
