= TiVo digital video recorders =

Encompass a number of digital video recorder models that TiVo Corporation designed

TiVo digital video recorders encompass a number of digital video recorder (DVR) models that TiVo Corporation designed. Features may vary, but a common feature is that all of the units listed here require TiVo service and use its operating system.

TiVo units have been manufactured by various OEMs, including Philips, Sony, Pioneer, Toshiba, and Humax. Cisco Systems and Samsung joined forces with pay TV Provider Virgin Media (UK-only) to create the Virgin Media TiVo box. The OEMs license the software from TiVo Corporation.

To date, there have been seven "series" of TiVo units produced, with the seventh series, the Edge, released in October 2019.

== DVR models ==
=== Series1 (1999) ===
Series 1 DVR models
Type	Manufacturer	Model	Capacity		Notes
Type	Manufacturer	Model	Hours	GB	Notes
Standalone	Philips	HDR110	13	12.7	First model, March 31, 1999
Standalone	Philips	HDR112	14	13	
Standalone	Philips	HDR212	20	20	
Standalone	Philips	HDR312	30	2x13	
Standalone	Philips	HDR31201; HDR31202; HDR31203; HDR31204	30	30	
Standalone	Philips	HDR612	60	2x30	
Standalone	Philips	Sony SVR-2000	30 or 40	30 or 40	Later models have a 40GB Maxtor hard drive. Custom remote control RMT-V303
Standalone	Thomson	PVR10UK			
Standalone	DirecTV	DSR6000	35	30-40	Some models came with a 30Gb hard drive while some came with a 40GB.
Sony	DirecTV	Sat-T60	35	40	
Hughes	DirecTV	GXCEBOT	35	40	

The Series1 (retronym) was the original TiVo digital video recorder.

Series1 TiVo systems are based on PowerPC processors connected to MPEG-2 encoder/decoder chips and IDE/ATA hard drives. Series1 TiVo units used one or two drives of 12.7–60 GB. Although not supported by TiVo or equipment manufacturers, larger drives can be added.

==== Series1 standalone ====
All standalone TiVo systems have coax/RF-in and an internal cable-ready tuner, analog video input—composite/RCA, and S-Video—for use with an external cable box or satellite receiver. The TiVo unit can use a serial cable or IR blasters to control the external receiver. They have coax/RF, composite/RCA, and S-Video output, and the DVD systems also have component out. Audio is RCA stereo, and the DVD systems also have digital optical out.

- CPU: IBM PowerPC 403GCX at 54 MHz
- RAM: 16 MB

==== Series1 DirecTV ====
Some TiVo systems are integrated with DirecTV receivers. These "DirecTiVo" recorders record the incoming satellite MPEG-2 digital stream directly to the hard disk without conversion. Because of this, and the fact that they have two tuners, DirecTiVos are able to record two programs at once. In addition, the lack of digital conversion allows recorded video to be of the same quality as live video. DirecTiVos have no MPEG encoder chip, and can only record DirecTV streams.

- CPU: IBM PowerPC 403GCX at 70-80 MHz
- RAM: 32 MB

=== Series2 (2001) ===
Type	Manufacturer	Model	Capacity		Notes
Type	Manufacturer	Model	Hours	GB	Notes
Standalone	TiVo/AT&T	TCD130040	40	40	Sky Digital mode
Standalone	TiVo/AT&T	TCD230040	40	40	
Standalone	TiVo	TCD230040	40	40	
Standalone	TiVo	TCD240040	40	40	40GB Quantum Hard Drive.
Standalone	TiVo	TCD24004A	40	40	40GB Maxtor Hard Drive.
Standalone	TiVo	TCD540040	40	40	
Standalone	TiVo	TCD140060	60	60	
Standalone	TiVo	TCD240080	80	80	80GB Quantum Hard Drive.
Standalone	TiVo	TCD24008A	80	80	80GB Maxtor Hard Drive.
Standalone	TiVo	TCD540080; TCD542080	80	80	
Standalone	TiVo	TCD240140			
Standalone	TiVo	TCD540140			
Standalone	TiVo	TCD649080	80	80	
Standalone	TiVo	TCD649180	180	160	
Standalone	Pioneer	DVR-810H	80	80	
Standalone	Pioneer	DVR-57H	120	120	
Standalone	Toshiba	SD-H400	80	80	
Standalone	Toshiba	RS-TX20	120	120	
Standalone	Toshiba	RS-TX60	160	160	
Standalone	Humax	T800			
Standalone	Humax	T2500	300	250	
Standalone	Humax	DRT400			
Standalone	Humax	DRT800	80	80	
Standalone	Sony	SVR-3000	80	80	
DirecTV	Hughes	HDVR2	35	40	
DirecTV	Hughes	HDVR3	35	40	
DirecTV	Hughes	SD-DVR40	35	40	
DirecTV	Hughes	SD-DVR80	70	80	
DirecTV	Hughes	SD-DVR120	100	120	
DirecTV	Philips	DSR7000	35	40	
DirecTV	Philips	DSR704	35	40	
DirecTV	Philips	DSR708	70	80	
DirecTV	RCA	DVR39	35	40	Same as HDVR2 (Made under license by Hughes)
DirecTV	RCA	DVR40	35	40	
DirecTV	RCA	DVR80	70	80	
DirecTV	Samsung	SIR-S4040R	35	40	
DirecTV	Samsung	SIR-S4080R	70	80	
DirecTV	Samsung	SIR-S4120R	100	120	
DirecTV	DirecTV/RCA	R10	70	80	
DirecTV	DirecTV/Hughes	HR10-250	250	250	

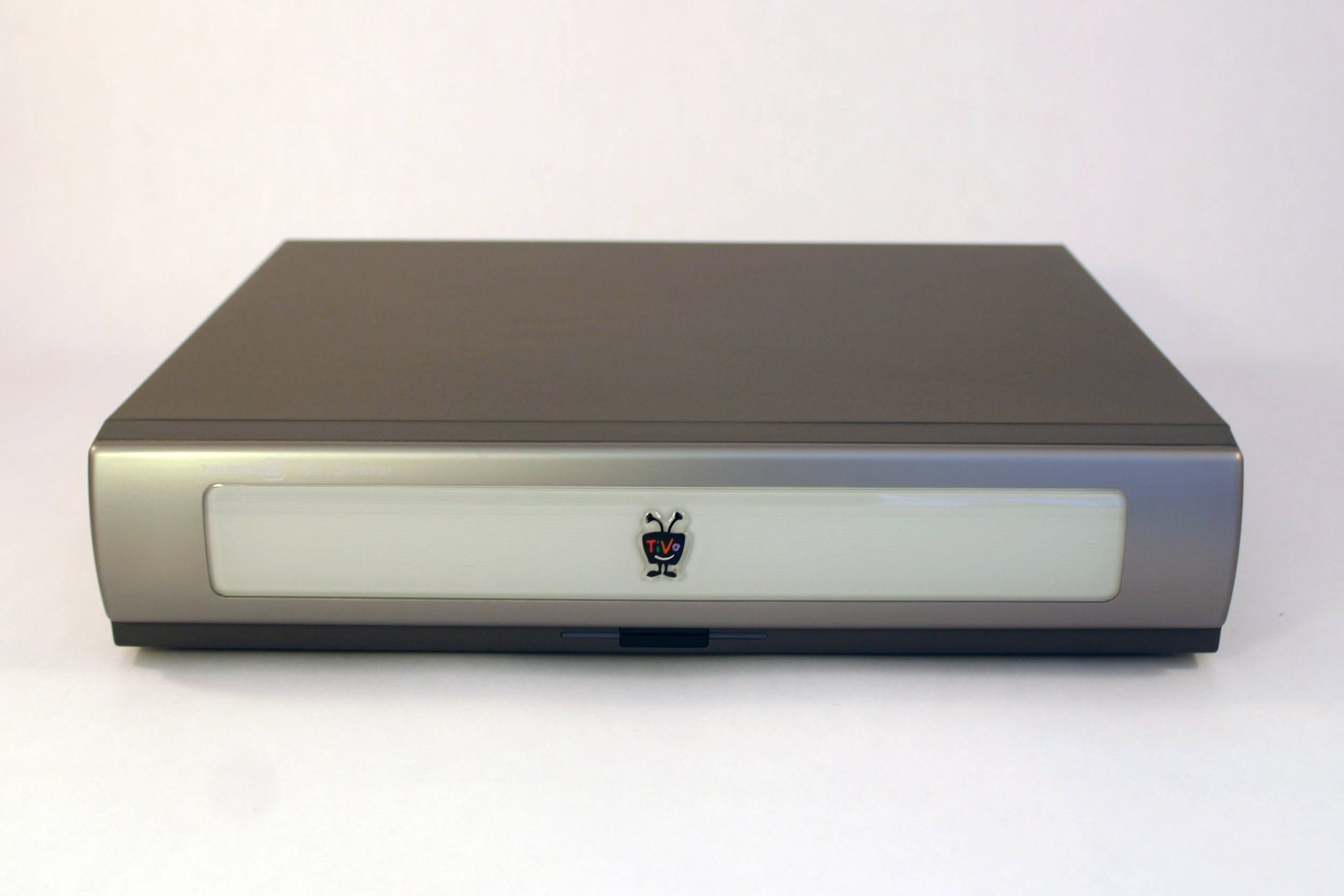
Front view of a Series2 TCD540040 TiVo unit

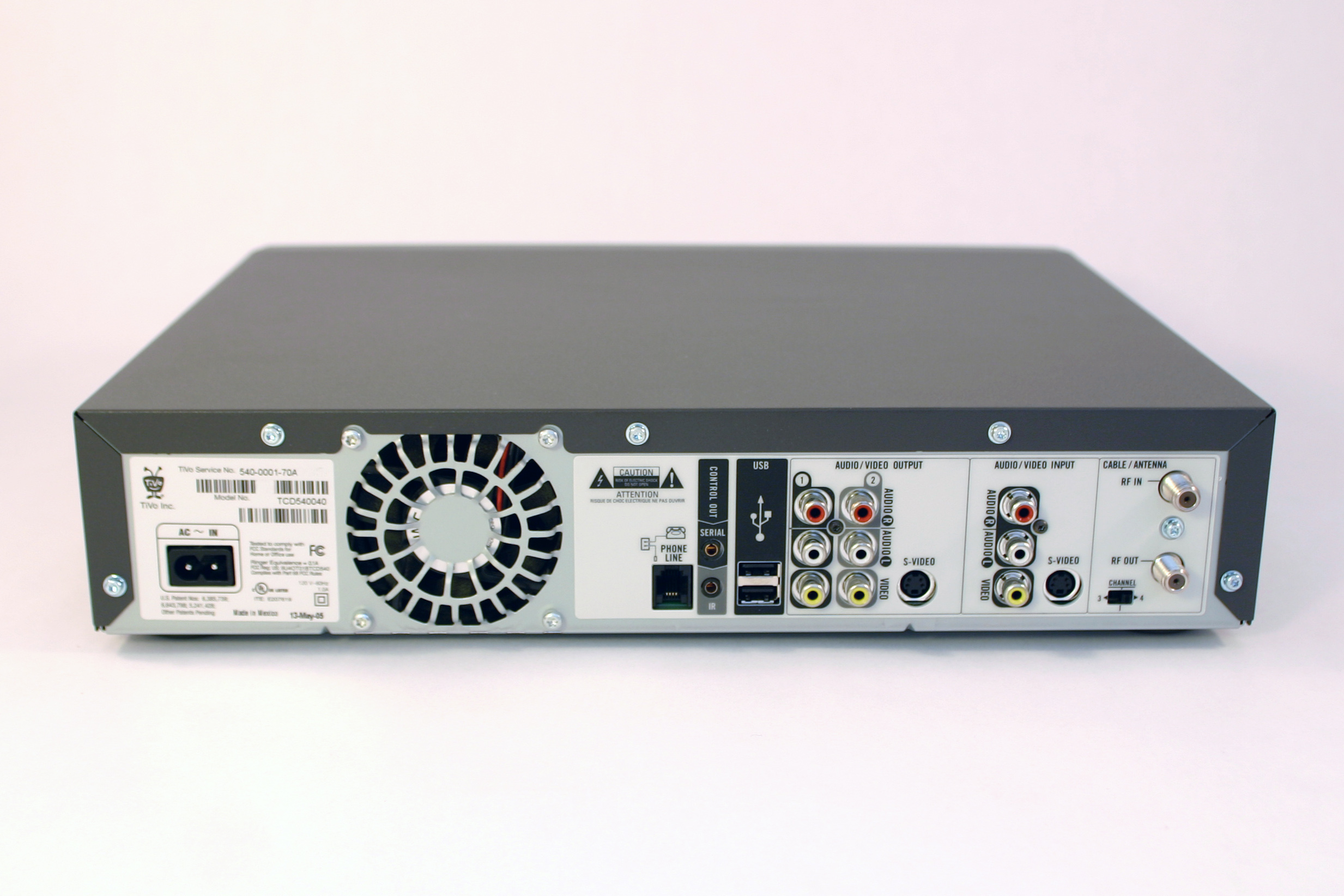
Back view of a Series2 TCD540040 TiVo unit

The Series2 was a complete redesign of the TiVo hardware. It includes USB ports (for Ethernet and Wi-Fi adapters), a new CPU, and more RAM. The availability of network connectivity has spread to the software side, where new features like TiVoToGo and Home Media Engine applications are now supported.

Series2 TiVo systems are based on MIPS processors connected to MPEG-2 encoder/decoder chips and high-capacity IDE/ATA hard drives. Series2 units had drives of 40–250 GB in size. Although not supported by TiVo or equipment manufacturers, larger drives can be added.

==== Series2 standalone ====
All standalone TiVo systems have coax/RF-in and an internal cable-ready tuner, analog video input—composite/RCA, and S-Video—for use with an external cable box or satellite receiver. The TiVo unit can use a serial cable or IR blasters to control the external receiver. They have coax/RF, composite/RCA, and S-Video output, and the DVD systems also have component out. Audio is RCA stereo, and the DVD systems also have digital optical out. The Series2 systems also have USB ports, currently used only to support network (wired Ethernet and WiFi) adapters. The early Series2 units, models starting with 110/130/140, have USB 1.1 hardware, while all other systems have USB 2.0.

Some models manufactured by Toshiba, Pioneer, and Humax, under license from TiVo, contain DVD-R/RW drives. The models can transfer recordings from the built-in hard drive to DVD Video-compliant discs, playable in most modern DVD systems. The video encoding on these models was modified to match the DVD standard so transferring to DVD does not require transcoding.

The Series2 standalones can only tune analog signals, so to comply with FCC rules on analog TV phaseout, models that record from over-the-air channels are no longer sold. The dual tuner (DT) models and the TCD542 (a revision of the TCD540) will only record from cable and satellite sources.

- CPU:
  - 1xx/2xx-series: NEC 5432 (MIPS), 166 MHz
  - 5xx-series: Broadcom BCM7317, 242 MHz
  - 6xx-series: Broadcom BCM7318, 266 MHz
- RAM:
  - 1xx/2xx/5xx-series: 32 MB of 133 MHz 16-bit DDR
  - 6xx-series: 64 MB of 133 MHz 16-bit DDR
- MPEG Encoder
  - 1xx/2xx/5xx-series: Broadcom BCM7040
  - 6xx-series: Two Broadcom BCM7042

==== Series2 DirecTV ====
Some TiVo systems are integrated with DirecTV receivers. These "DirecTiVo" recorders record the incoming satellite MPEG-2 digital stream directly to hard disk without conversion. Because of this and the fact that they have two tuners, DirecTiVos are able to record two programs at once. In addition, the lack of digital conversion allows recorded video to be of the same quality as live video. DirecTiVos have no MPEG encoder chip, and can only record DirecTV streams. However, DirecTV has disabled the networking capabilities on their systems, meaning DirecTiVo does not offer such features as multi-room viewing or TiVoToGo. Only the standalone systems can be networked without additional unsupported hacking.

The HR10-250 DirecTiVo units can also record HDTV to a 250 GB hard drive, both from the DirecTV stream and over-the-air via a standard UHF- or VHF-capable antenna. They have four tuners (two DirecTV and two ATSC over-the-air) and, like the original DirecTiVo, can record two programs at once; further, the program guide is integrated between over-the-air and DirecTV so that all programs can be recorded and viewed in the same manner. Recording capacity is variable, up to 30 HD or 200 SD hours.

- CPU:
  - HR10: 200 MHz

On July 8, 2006, DirecTV announced an upgrade to version 6.3 of the TiVo software for the HR10-250, the first major upgrade since this unit was released. This upgrade includes features such as program grouping (folders), a much faster on-screen guide, and new sorting features.

In October 2007, DirecTV sent a message to all DirecTV TiVo R10 and HR10 users saying that they will be applying numerous features to the DirecTiVo. It include two features:

- Episode Recovery is a feature that will let you recover a previously deleted episode of a show. There will be a time frame of the time you could recover the episode, but the information has not been released.
- Online Scheduling (broadcast programming) is a feature that will allow you to go to the DirecTV guide on the internet, and choose a television program to be recorded. This feature is popular with the TiVo Brand DVR's, but DirecTV's contract with TiVo did not allow them to implement the online features of the DirecTiVo.

=== Series3 HD (2006) ===
Type	Manufacturer	Model	Capacity		Notes	Software Version
Type	Manufacturer	Model	Hours HD/SD	GB	Notes	Software Version
Standalone	TiVo	TCD648250B (a.k.a. Series3 HD)	32/300	250	THX-certified, no M-Card support.	11.0n
Standalone	TiVo	TCD652160 (a.k.a. HD)	20/180	160		11.0n.K1
Standalone	TiVo	TCD658000 (a.k.a. HD XL)	150/1,350	1,024	THX-certified	11.0n.K1
Standalone	TiVo	TCD663160 (a.k.a. 160)	30/60	160	Australia/NZ Model, DVB-T, Dolby Digital Decoder	11.3b8
Standalone	TiVo	TCD663320 (a.k.a. 320)	60/120	320	Australia/NZ Model, DVB-T, Dolby Digital Decoder	11.3b8
Standalone	TiVo	TCD663000 (a.k.a. XL)	150/1,350	1,024	Australia/NZ Model, DVB-T, Dolby Digital Decoder	11.3b8

The Series3 TiVo was officially unveiled at the 2006 Consumer Electronics Show, and was released to the public on September 12, 2006. In April 2010, it was superseded by the Series 4 "TiVo Premiere" and is supported but no longer manufactured by TiVo for North American markets.

The Series3 DVR features support for high-definition broadcasts and has two tuners. In North America, they each can receive analog and HDTV over-the-air (NTSC and ATSC) in addition to both analog and digital cable (QAM). Encrypted digital cable is decoded through CableCARDs available from the cable providers. As of September 2009 satellite TV connections are not supported. In Australia and New Zealand, the dual tuners support the recording of two digital (DVB-T) over-the-air signals at the same time, whilst playing back a third.

With the dual tuners, it can record or view any two sources simultaneously. For example, two over-the-air broadcasts, two cable programs, or any combination can be recorded at the same time. The initial hardware release (TCD648250B) was unable to take advantage of Multi-Stream CableCARDs and required the use of a pair of CableCARDs to enable its dual tuners with encrypted digital cable. The follow-up Series3 models had an option of using either one Multi-Stream card or two single stream cards.

Switched Digital Video (SDV), a technology which allows cable providers to only send the channel streams being watched instead of the entire channel lineup in order to better manage bandwidth, requires a USB attachment to a separate tuning adapter available from the cable providers.

One HDMI port and two sets of component, S-video, and composite outputs are included. The Series 3 is also the first DVR to feature THX-certified audio and video. The unit is also equipped with two USB 2.0 ports, a Fast Ethernet port, and a telephone modem, which are all used to connect to the TiVo service. The built-in wired Ethernet or an optional USB 802.11 wireless adapter could download video on demand from various providers. Multi-room viewing and transferring programs to and from a PC is allowed. HD content may only be transferred between Series 3 units, or Series 3 and later models.

A Series 3 can be connected to several types of televisions and if necessary convert to the appropriate resolution. This allows displaying HD channels on older TVs using composite or s-video connections.

Storage can be increased to 2 TB by replacement of the hard drive—something that can be done professionally, but is usually done by users familiar with how to perform PC drive replacement. An external SATA port allows up to 1 TB in additional storage when using TiVo-certified external hard drives.

- CPU: Broadcom BCM7038
- RAM: 128 MB for general CPU use- more for the encoders

=== Series4 Premiere (2010) ===
Type	Manufacturer	Model	Capacity		Tuners	Notes	Software Version
Type	Manufacturer	Model	Hours HD/SD	GB	Tuners	Notes	Software Version
Standalone	TiVo	TCD746320 (a.k.a. Premiere, 2010 model)	45/400	320	2	2160p, 4K interface, optional qwerty remote	20.7.4d.RC15
Standalone	TiVo	TCD746500 (a.k.a. Premiere, 2012 model)	75/650	500	2	2012 upgrade of TiVo Premiere, additional recording capacity	20.7.4d.RC15
Standalone	TiVo	TCD748000 (a.k.a. Premiere XL)	150/1,350	1,024	2	Premium remote	20.7.4d.RC15
Standalone	TiVo	TCD750500 (a.k.a. Premiere 4)	75/650	500	4		20.7.4d.RC15
Standalone	TiVo	TCD758250 (a.k.a. Premiere Elite/XL4)	300/2,200	2,048	4	Premium remote	20.7.4d.RC15
DirecTV	TiVo	THR22-100 (a.k.a. DirecTV DVR)	61/529	500	2	DirecTV Exclusive, THX certified	20.4.7
Virgin Media	Cisco Systems	CT8685DVB (a.k.a. Virgin Media TiVo)	150/1,350	1,024	3	UK-only, HD interface, 10-Mbit/s dedicated line, THX certified	Hydra 20.7.4
Virgin Media	Cisco Systems	CT8620DVB (a.k.a. Virgin Media TiVo)	75/675	500	3	UK-only, HD interface, 10-Mbit/s dedicated line, THX certified	Hydra 20.7.4
Virgin Media	Samsung	SMT-C7100 (a.k.a. Virgin Media TiVo)	75/500	500	3	UK-only, HD interface, 10-Mbit/s, (Successor of Cisco Systems CT8620DVB)	20.4.3
Virgin Media	Samsung	SMT-7101	150/1,350	1,024	3	HD interface, 10Mbit/s, (Successor of Cisco Systems CT8685DVB)	BIOS Revision A11
Canal Digital	Technicolor SA	DSI803	45/400	320	2	Canada only	Bios Revision A23

The Series4 TiVo Premiere was officially unveiled on March 2, 2010, and was released to the public on March 28, 2010. The higher-end Premiere model features a more sophisticated remote and larger hard drive. The TiVo Premiere has the features of the Series 3 TiVos with the addition of support for 1080p high definition video, and a new high definition user interface using Haxe. It is also Energy Star compliant after cutting power consumption by 35% to 45%. The slimmer unit relies on a single Multi-stream CableCARD ("M-Card") slot and uses a dual core processor delivering greater performance. Communication speeds are claimed to be 3 to 5 times faster than a TiVo HD, and supports an optional QWERTY keyboard remote that communicates via Bluetooth (recently discontinued) . Like the Series 3, it does not support analog video input from devices such as satellite television or AT&T U-verse set top boxes as do the Series 2 TiVos. The new user interface is meant to seamlessly integrate features such as Rhapsody, Netflix, Amazon, Blockbuster, Hulu, and YouTube video, and make development of such applications easier through use of Adobe Stagecraft (Flash Lite 3.1 + Actionscript 2.0). The operating system enhancement allows third party Flash applications similar to those possible with HME, and other Flash Lite consumer devices such as Chumby. Such applications will be available from TiVo's application store.

Hardware:

- CPU: Broadcom BCM7413 400MHZ dual core 1100 Dhrystone MIPS vs. TiVo HD's 400 DMIPS

=== Series5 Roamio (2013) ===
Type	Manufacturer	Model	Capacity		Tuners	Notes	Software Version
Type	Manufacturer	Model	Hours HD/SD	TB	Tuners	Notes	Software Version
Standalone	TiVo	TCD846510 (a.k.a. Roamio OTA)	75/500	0.5	4	Tuners Digital OTA only (CableCARD can be added using a bracket), built-in Wi-Fi, Netflix, Hulu, Amazon Video, YouTube, Pandora, and Spotify	20.7.4d.RC15 / 21.11.1.v22 Hydra
Standalone	TiVo	TCD846000 (a.k.a. Roamio OTA)	150/1,000	1	4	Tuners Digital OTA only (CableCARD can be added using a bracket), built-in Wi-Fi, Netflix, Hulu, Amazon Video, YouTube, Pandora, and Spotify	20.7.4d.RC15 / 21.11.1.v22 Hydra
Standalone	TiVo	TCD846000V (a.k.a. Roamio OTA VOX)	150/1,000	1	4	Tuners Digital OTA only, built-in Wi-Fi, Netflix, Hulu, Amazon Video, YouTube, Pandora, and Spotify; includes voice remote	20.7.4d.RC15 / 21.11.1.v22 Hydra
Standalone	TiVo	TCD846500 (a.k.a. Roamio)	75/500	0.5	4	Tuners Digital OTA or digital cable, built-in Wi-Fi, Netflix, Hulu, Amazon Video, YouTube, Pandora, and Spotify	20.7.4d.RC15 / 21.11.1.v22 Hydra
Standalone	TiVo	TCD848000 (a.k.a. Roamio Plus)	150/1,000	1	6	Tuners through digital cable only, built-in Wi-Fi, TiVo Stream, Remote Finder, Netflix, Hulu, Amazon Video, YouTube, Pandora, and Spotify	20.7.4d.RC15 / 21.11.1.v22 Hydra
Standalone	TiVo	TCD840300 (a.k.a. Roamio Pro)	450/3,000	3	6	Tuners through digital cable only, built-in Wi-Fi, TiVo Stream, Remote Finder, Netflix, Hulu, Amazon Video, YouTube, Pandora, and Spotify	20.7.4d.RC15 / 21.11.1.v22 Hydra
RCN	TiVo	TiVo T6	150/1,000	1	6	Tuners through digital cable only, built-in Wi-Fi, Netflix, YouTube, Pandora, and Spotify	20.6.3
Grande	TiVo	TiVo T6	150/1,000	1	6	Tuners through digital cable only, built-in Wi-Fi, Netflix, YouTube, Pandora, and Spotify	20.6.3
Atlantic Broadband	TiVo	TiVo T6	150/1,000	1	6	Tuners through digital cable only, built- in Wi-Fi, Netflix, YouTube, Pandora, and Spotify	20.7.4
Cogeco	TiVo	TiVo T6	150/1,000	1	6	Tuners through digital cable only, built-in Wi-Fi, Netflix and YouTube	20.6.3
Blue Ridge	TiVo	TiVo T6	150/1,000	1	6	Tuners through digital cable only, built-in Wi-Fi, Netflix, YouTube, Pandora and Hulu	20.6.3
Armstrong Cable Services	Pace	PX001DNT	150/1,000	N/A	N/A	UK-only, use Scart output/input	BIOS Revision A11

The TiVo Roamio was made available on August 20, 2013.

Hardware:

- CPU: Broadcom BCM7241 3000 Dhrystone MIPS
- Transcoder: NXP (Freescale / Zenverge) ZN200 (Roamio Plus and Pro only)

=== Series6 Bolt (2015) ===
Type	Manufacturer	Model	Capacity		Tuners	Notes	Software Version
Type	Manufacturer	Model	Hours HD/SD	TB	Tuners	Notes	Software Version
Standalone	TiVo/Arris	TCD849500 (Bolt)	75/500	0.5	4	Digital OTA or digital cable, built-in Wi-Fi, Netflix, Hulu, Amazon Video, YouTube, Pandora, and Spotify	20.7.4d.RC15 / 21.11.1.v22
Standalone	TiVo/Arris	TCD849000 (Bolt)	150/1,000	1	4	Digital OTA or digital cable, built-in Wi-Fi, Netflix, Hulu, Amazon Video, YouTube, Pandora, and Spotify	20.7.4d.RC15 / 21.11.1.v22
Standalone	TiVo/Arris	TCD849300 (Bolt+)	450/3,000	3	6	Digital cable only, built-in Wi-Fi, Netflix, Hulu, Amazon Video, YouTube, Pandora, and Spotify	20.7.4d.RC15 / 21.11.1.v22
Standalone	TiVo/Arris	TCD849500V (Bolt Vox)	75/500	0.5	4	Digital OTA or digital cable, built-in Wi-Fi, Netflix, Hulu, Amazon Video, YouTube, Pandora, and Spotify; includes voice remote	20.7.4d.RC15 / 21.11.1.v22
Standalone	TiVo/Arris	TCD849000V (Bolt Vox)	150/1,000	1	4	Digital OTA or digital cable, built-in Wi-Fi, Netflix, Hulu, Amazon Video, YouTube, Pandora, and Spotify; includes voice remote	20.7.4d.RC15 / 21.11.1.v22
Standalone	TiVo/Arris	TCD849100V (Bolt Vox)	150/1,000	1	6	Digital cable only, built-in Wi-Fi, Netflix, Hulu, Amazon Video, YouTube, Pandora, and Spotify; includes voice remote	20.7.4d.RC15 / 21.11.1.v22
Standalone	TiVo/Arris	TCD849300V (Bolt Vox)	450/3,000	3	6	Digital cable only, built-in Wi-Fi, Netflix, Hulu, Amazon Video, YouTube, Pandora, and Spotify; includes voice remote	20.7.4d.RC15 / 21.11.1.v22
Standalone	TiVo/Arris	TCD849000VO (Bolt OTA)	150/1,000	1	4	Digital OTA only, built-in Wi-Fi, Netflix, Hulu, Amazon Video, YouTube, Pandora, and Spotify; includes voice remote	21.11.1.v22

The Bolt was made available for sale on September 30, 2015.

Hardware:

- CPU: Broadcom BCM7449

=== Series7 Edge (2019) ===
Type	Manufacturer	Model	Capacity		Tuners	Notes	Software Version	Ref.
Type	Manufacturer	Model	Hours HD	TB	Tuners	Notes	Software Version	Ref.
Standalone	TiVo	TCDD6E200 (for Cable)	300	2	6	Built-in MoCA networking; Dolby Vision and Dolby Atmos, up to 4K resolution. Includes Vox voice remote.	21.11.1.v22	
Standalone	TiVo	TCDD6F200 (for Antenna)	300	2	4	Dolby Vision and Dolby Atmos, up to 4K resolution. Includes Lux backlit remote.	21.11.1.v22	
Standalone	TiVo	TCDD6F500 (for Antenna)	75	0.5	2	Dolby Vision and Dolby Atmos, up to 4K resolution. Includes RF remote.	21.11.1.v22	

This was the only TiVo to be manufactured by Arris. It is also the first TiVo (excluding the BOLT OTA) that can only use TE4 (TiVo Experience 4) and not TE3.

== Other hardware ==
=== Mini ===
Model	Notes	Software Version
TCDA92000 TiVo Mini (2013 model)	Borrows tuner from host DVR over Ethernet or MoCA connection; Netflix, Hulu, Amazon Video, Pandora, and Spotify; includes IR remote.	20.7.4d.RC15 / 21.11.1.v22
TCDA93000 TiVo Mini (2015 model)	Borrows tuner from host DVR over Ethernet or MoCA connection; Netflix, Hulu, Amazon Video, Pandora, and Spotify; includes RF remote.	20.7.4d.RC15 / 21.11.1.v22
TCDA95000 TiVo Mini Vox	Borrows tuner from host DVR over Ethernet or MoCA connection; Netflix, Hulu, Amazon Video, Pandora, and Spotify; 4K video compatible; includes Vox voice remote	20.7.4d.RC15 / 21.11.1.v22
TCDA96000 TiVo Mini Lux	Borrows tuner from host DVR over Ethernet or MoCA connection; Netflix, Hulu, Amazon Video, Pandora, and Spotify; 4K video compatible; includes Lux backlit voice remote	20.7.4d.RC15 / 21.11.1.v22

Mini VOX Specs:

- 12,000 DMIPS CPU
- 2 GB DRAM
- 8 GB eMMC Flash
- Video decode up to 4Kp60
- Graphics 1.2 Gp/s OpenGL ES3.1, scalable video-in-graphics
- HDMI 2.0a output (supporting HDR10)
- Gigabit Ethernet 10/100/1000
- MoCA 2.0 Interface (400+Mbps)

=== Stream ===
Introduced in 2012, Stream (not to be confused with Stream 4K) is an accessory that enables streaming (sometimes called "second-screen" viewing) from TiVo Premiere or Roamio DVRs to mobile devices, including iOS and Android smartphones and tablets using the TiVo app.

Stream is a transcoder. It converts recorded MPEG-2 content from the Premiere or Roamio DVR to a reduced data rate format suitable for the mobile client on a wireless connection (H.264, usually at 720p.) Stream's hardware core is a specialized chip: the NXP (formerly Zenverge) ZN200.

Stream connects to the TiVo DVR via Ethernet on the customer's local network. On the mobile device, TiVo App discovers Stream and sets it up for use. The TiVo App user then selects a program from their DVR for viewing or downloading on their device. Downloading is at up to 4x the display rate; view-while-download is also possible. Stream can handle multiple mobile TiVo App client sessions at the same time.

Roamio Plus and Roamio Pro have Stream capability built-in, with identical capabilities to standalone Stream.

TiVo BOLT supports streaming with its own transcoder. It is also compatible with Stream for users who need to support more clients or faster downloading.

TiVo announced at CES 2020 on January 7, 2020, a new streaming product called TiVo Stream 4K. This is a new product and has no relation to the previously released TiVo Stream hardware.

=== Bridge ===
Bridge is an accessory to connect an Ethernet network to MoCA. It supports Ethernet (10/100/Gbit) and MoCA 2.0 (up to 450 Mbit/s) connections. The Bridge is most often used to connect a whole-home TiVo DVR + Mini network to the household WAN/LAN router. It can also be used to add MoCA networking to TiVo DVRs that do not include it, such as the two-tuner Premiere and the Roamio.

MoCA networking is a popular choice for whole-home DVR systems because, unlike Ethernet, it uses ordinary RG-6 coaxial cabling which may already be installed in the customer's home. It is also often used in place of wireless as it provides a reliable, fade-free connection robust enough to handle even high-rate MPEG-2 video from the DVR.

== TiVo app ==
TiVo announced an iPad app on November 22, 2010. The app allows customers to manage their TiVos from their iPad.

The TiVo companion app for iPad was released in the weeks following its announcement. iPhone support was also added to the app.

The app works with TiVo Premiere, Premiere XL, Premiere 4, Premiere XL4, Roamio, BOLT, and EDGE boxes. Limited functionality is also available for Series 3 devices.

TiVo also released apps for the iPhone and Android devices. TiVo's Director of Retail and Channel Marketing, Bard Williams, stated the app: "... offers ... complete control over management and program selection, a multi-touch remote that features gestures-based navigation, and the ability to manage and navigate Season Pass recording, your queue and info about cast, crew, similar shows – without interrupting your TV experience ... When you're not at home, the app still lets you interact with your Premiere for basic management and recording tasks."
