= TiVo =

Series of digital video recorders

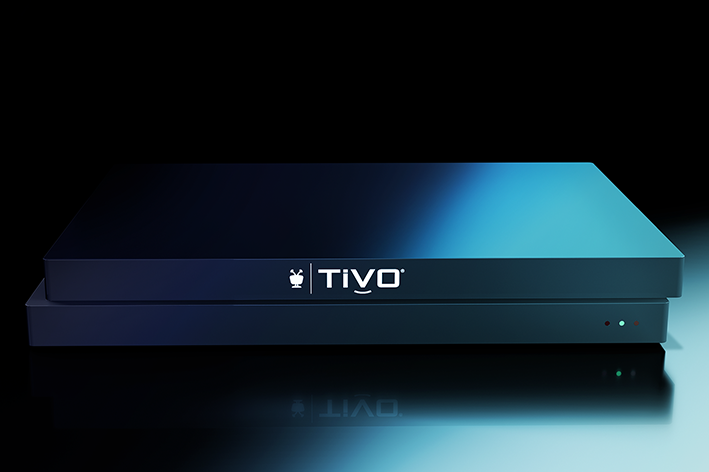
- TiVo Edge DVR
- Developer: Xperi
- Type: Digital video recorder
- Released: March 31, 1999; 27 years ago
- Discontinued: October 1, 2025; 13 months ago
- Operating system: Linux
- Website: www.tivo.com

TiVo (/ˈtiːvoʊ/ TEE-voh) is a discontinued line of digital video recorders (DVR) developed and marketed by Xperi (previously by TiVo Corporation and TiVo Inc.) and introduced in 1999. TiVo provides an on-screen guide of scheduled broadcast programming television programs, whose features include "OnePass" schedules which record every new episode of a series, and wishlist searches which allow the user to find and record shows that match their interests by title, actor, director, category, or keyword. TiVo also provides a range of features when the TiVo DVR is connected to a home network, including film and TV show downloads, advanced search, online scheduling, and at one time, personal photo viewing and local music playback.

After its launch in its home market of the United States, TiVo units were also sold in Australia, Canada, Mexico, New Zealand, Puerto Rico, Sweden, Taiwan, Spain, and the United Kingdom. Later models adopted the CableCARD standard, which is only deployed in the United States, and which limits the availability of certain features. TiVo discontinued its DVR hardware products in October 2025.

== History ==
Logo used from 1999 to 2015. Shown here is the 2012 version.

TiVo was developed by Jim Barton and Mike Ramsay through a corporation they named "Teleworld" which was later renamed TiVo Inc. Though they originally intended to create a home network device, it was redesigned as a device that records digitized video onto a hard disk.

After exhibiting at the Consumer Electronics Show in January 1997, Mike Ramsay announced to the company that the first version of the TiVo digital video recorder would be released "in Q1" (the last day of which is March 31) despite an estimated 4 to 5 months of work remaining to complete the device. Because March 31, 1999 was a blue moon, the engineering staff code-named this first version of the TiVo DVR "Blue Moon".

The original TiVo DVR digitized and compressed analogue video from any source (antenna, cable or direct broadcast satellite). TiVo also integrated its DVR service into the set-top boxes of satellite and cable providers. In late 2000, Philips Electronics introduced the DSR6000, the first DirecTV receiver with an integrated TiVo DVR. This new device, nicknamed the "DirecTiVo", stored digital signals sent from DirecTV directly onto a hard disk.

In early 2000, TiVo partnered with electronics manufacturer Thomson Multimedia (now Technicolor SA) and broadcaster British Sky Broadcasting to deliver the TiVo service in the UK market. This partnership resulted in the Thomson PVR10UK, a stand-alone receiver released in October 2000 that was based on the original reference design used in the United States by both Philips and Sony. TiVo ended UK unit sales in January 2003, though it continued to sell subscriptions and supply guide data to existing subscribed units until June 2011. TiVo branded products returned to the UK during 2010 under an exclusive partnership with cable TV provider Virgin Media.

TiVo was launched in Australia in July 2008 by Hybrid Television Services, a company owned by Australia's Seven Media Group and New Zealand's TVNZ. TiVo Australia also launched a TiVo with a 320Gb hard Drive in 2009. TiVo Australia also launched Blockbuster on demand and in December 2009 launched a novel service called Caspa on Demand. TiVo also went on sale in New Zealand on 6 November 2009.

Janet Jackson's Super Bowl halftime show incident on February 1, 2004, set a record for being the most watched, recorded and replayed moment in TiVo history. The baring of one of Jackson's breasts at the end of her duet with Justin Timberlake, which caused a flood of outraged phone calls to CBS, was replayed a record number of times by TiVo users. A company representative stated, "The audience measurement guys have never seen anything like it. The audience reaction charts looked like an electrocardiogram."

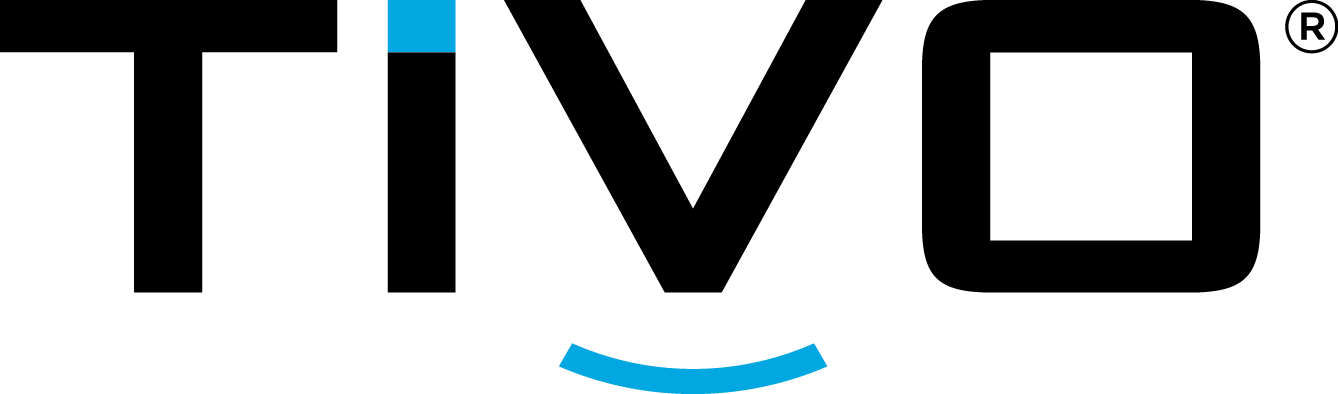
Wordmark variant from 2015 to 2020

In April 2016, Rovi acquired TiVo for $1.1 billion.

In December 2019, it was announced that TiVo would merge with Xperi Corporation. The merger completed in May 2020.

In early February 2024, TiVo removed the antenna version of the TiVo Edge from their website, apparently discontinuing their OTA line of DVRs. The cable version of the TiVo Edge as well as the TiVo Mini LUX and TiVo Stream 4K continued to be available.

The TiVo Mini LUX went permanently out of stock in June/July 2025. It has yet to be clarified when the TiVo Stream 4K was discontinued. The TiVo Edge DVR for Cable, along with all remaining hardware accessories, were removed from sale on TiVo's website in late September/early October 2025, and sales of annual and lifetime service subscriptions were discontinued, leaving monthly subscriptions as the only remaining service option for TiVo Roamio, TiVo BOLT, and TiVo Edge boxes that do not already have active service plans. Variety reported that TiVo had exited the hardware manufacturing business on October 1, 2025, and that remaining inventory had been depleted.

Despite the discontinuation, TiVo continues to manufacture its TiVo OS brand of smart TV devices, among a few other products.

== Service ==
A TiVo DVR serves a function similar to that of a videocassette recorder (VCR), in that both allow a TV viewer to record programming for viewing at a later time, known as time shifting. Unlike a videocassette recorder, which uses removable magnetic tape cartridges, a TiVo DVR stores TV programs on an internal hard drive, much like a computer.

A TiVo DVR also automatically records programs that the user is likely to be interested in. TiVo DVRs also implement a patented feature that TiVo calls "trick play", allowing the viewer to pause live television and rewind and replay up to 30 minutes of recently viewed TV. TiVo DVRs can be connected to a computer local area network, allowing the TiVo device to download information, access video streaming services such as Netflix or Hulu, as well as music from the Internet.

=== Functions ===
TiVo DVRs communicate with TiVo's servers on a regular basis to receive program information updates, including description, regular and guest actors, directors, genres, whether programs are new or repeats, and whether the broadcast is in High Definition (HD). Information is updated daily into its program guide from Rovi (Tribune Media Services was used prior to September 2016).

Users can select individual programs to record or a "OnePass" (formerly "Season Pass") to record all episodes of a show. There are options to record First Run Only, First Run and Repeats, or All Episodes. An episode is considered "First Run" if aired within two weeks of that episode's initial air date. OnePasses can also "bookmark" shows from internet streaming video services and show a combined view of recordings and bookmarks.

When users' requests for multiple programs are conflicting, the lower priority program in the OnePass Manager is either not recorded or clipped where times overlap. The lower priority program will be recorded if it is aired later. TiVo DVRs with multiple tuners simultaneously record the top priority programs.

TiVo pioneered recording programs based on household viewing habits; this is called TiVo Suggestions. Users can rate programs from three "thumbs up" to three "thumbs down". TiVo user ratings are combined to create a recommendation, based on what TiVo users with similar viewing habits watch. For example, if one user likes American Idol, America's Got Talent and Dancing with the Stars, then another TiVo user who watched just American Idol might get a recommendation for the other two shows. As of 2023, TiVo Suggestions are no longer supported. The Thumbs Up/Down buttons can no longer be used to rate programs.

The amount of storage capacity for programs is dependent upon the size of the hard drive inside the TiVo; different models have different sized hard drives. When the space is full on the hard drive, the oldest programs are deleted to make space for the newer ones; programs that users flag to not be deleted are kept and TiVo Suggestions are always lowest priority. The recording capacity of a TiVo HD DVR can be expanded with an external hard drive, which can add additional hours of HD recording space and standard definition video recording capacity.

When not recording specific user requests, the current channel is recorded for up to 30 minutes. Dual-tuner models record two channels. This allows users to rewind or pause anything that has been shown in the last thirty minutes — useful when viewing is interrupted. Shows already in progress can be entirely recorded if less than 30 minutes have been shown. Unlike VCRs, TiVo can record and play at the same time. A program can be watched from the beginning even if it is in the middle of being recorded, which is something that VCRs cannot do. Some users take advantage of this by waiting 10 to 15 minutes after a program starts (or is replayed from a recording), so that they can fast forward through commercials. In this way, by the end of the recording viewers are caught up with live television.

Unlike most DVRs, TiVo DVRs are easily connected to home networks, allowing users to schedule recordings on TiVo's website (via TiVo Central Online), and transfer recordings between TiVo units (Multi-Room Viewing (MRV)). Former and now discontinued features included the ability transfer recordings to and from a home computer (TiVoToGo (TTG) transfers), play music and view photos over the network, and access third-party applications written for TiVo's Home Media Engine (HME) API. These transfers, both between TiVo units and to home computers is often restricted by a flag embedded in a digital broadcast or cable transmission that dictates whether a TiVo can transfer a recording. This flag is called the CCI byte (Copy Control Information byte), which typically carries a setting known as "Copy Once" (resulting in a prohibition icon or red circle-slash next to the show, blocking Multi-Room Viewing or TiVoToGo transfers). The decision on its setting is made by the content provider or broadcaster (such as a cable network, premium channel, or local station), who chooses how to encode the stream. Most programs originating from the premium channels such as HBO, Showtime, and others, carried this flag and therefore could not be transferred. In addition, some cable companies similarly flag most or all of their programming, severely hampering this TiVo feature.

TiVo added a number of broadband features, most of which are no longer offered. These include:

Integration with Amazon Video on Demand, Jaman.com and Netflix Watch Instantly, offering users access to thousands of movie titles and television shows right from the comfort of their couch. Additionally, broadband connected to TiVo boxes can access digital photos from Picasa Web Albums or Photobucket. Another popular feature is access to Rhapsody music through TiVo, allowing users to listen to virtually any song from their living room. TiVo also teamed up with One True Media to give subscribers a private channel for sharing photos and video with family and friends. They can also access weather, traffic, Fandango movie listings (including ticket purchases), and music through Live365. In the summer of 2008 TiVo announced the availability of YouTube videos on TiVo.

On June 7, 2006, TiVo began offering TiVoCast, a broadband download service that initially offered content from places such as Rocketboom or, The New York Times; now there are over 70 TivoCast channels available for TiVo subscribers.

In January 2005, TiVoToGo, a feature allowing transfer of recorded shows from TiVo boxes to PCs, was added. TiVo partnered with Sonic in the release of MyDVD 6.1, software for editing and converting TiVoToGo files. In January, 2007, TiVoToGo was extended to the Macintosh with Toast Titanium 8, Roxio software for assembly and burning digital media on CD and DVD media. In August, 2005, TiVo rolled out "TiVo Desktop" allowing the copying of MPEG2 video files from PCs to TiVo for playback by DVR. As of June 5, 2013, TiVo stopped distributing the free version of TiVo Desktop for PC in favor of selling TiVo Desktop Plus. Users who previously downloaded the free version of TiVo Desktop could continue to use the software without paying a fee for the Plus edition.

Parental features

TiVo KidZone (later removed in the Premiere and Roamio devices) was designed to give parents greater control over what their children see on television. This feature allows parents to choose which shows their children can watch and record. It also helps kids discover new shows through recommendations from leading national children's organizations. TiVo KidZone provides a customized Now Playing List for children that displays only pre-approved shows, keeping television as safe as possible.

=== Subscription service ===
The information that a TiVo DVR downloads regarding television schedules, as well as software updates and any other relevant information is available through a monthly service subscription in the United States. A different model applies in Australia, where the TiVo media device is bought for a one-off fee, without further subscription costs.

Lifetime subscription

There are multiple types of Product Lifetime Service. For satellite-enabled TiVo DVRs, the lifetime subscription remains as long as the account is active; the subscription does not follow a specific piece of hardware. This satellite lifetime subscription cannot be transferred to another person. Toshiba and Pioneer TiVo DVD recording equipped units include a "Basic Lifetime Subscription", which is very similar to Full Lifetime, except only three days of the program guide are viewable; and search and Internet capabilities are not available, or at least are limited. All units (except satellite but including DVD units) can have "Product Lifetime Subscription" added to the TiVo service, which covers the life of the TiVo DVR, not the life of the subscriber. The Product Lifetime Subscription accompanies the TiVo DVR in case of ownership-transfer. TiVo makes no warranties or representations as to the expected lifetime of the TiVo DVR (aside from the manufacturer's Limited Warranty). In the past TiVo has offered multiple "Trade Up" programs where you could transfer the Product Lifetime Subscription from an old unit to a newer model with a fee. A TiVo can be used without a service-agreement, but it will act more like a VCR in that you can only perform manual recordings and the TiVo can't be connected to the TiVo service for local time, program guide data, software updates, etc. or TiVo will shut down the recording function.

== International operations ==
The TiVo service is available in the United States, United Kingdom, Canada, Mexico, Spain and Taiwan at present. Over the years since its initial release in the United States, TiVo Series1 and Series2 DVRs have also been modified by end users to work in Australia, Brazil, Canada, New Zealand, the Netherlands, and South Africa.

TiVo went on sale in New Zealand in the first week of November 2009, and came to an end in 2017.

The TiVo Service came to an end in Australia on 31 October 2017. The electronic programming guide and TiVo recording features are no longer available, thus making all TiVo machines in Australia virtually useless.

=== United Kingdom ===
Thomson, Tivo s1 box

The TiVo service was launched in the United Kingdom in the autumn of 2000 in a partnerhsip between Thomson multimedia and BSKYB. It sold only 35,000 units over the next 18 months due to it being exclusively available to customers of Sky. Thomson, makers of the only UK TiVo box, abandoned it in early 2002 after BSkyB launched its Sky+ integrated "set-top" decoder and DVR which dominated the market for DVRs in homes subscribing to BSkyB's paid-for satellite television service. TiVo ended UK sales in January 2003 and shortly after, online electrical retailers picked up and sold off the surplus stock with sky saying we "decided to go a different route, but it wasn't a failure, we developed some loyal customers,".

Since then many manufacturers, including Thomson have launched integrated decoder boxes/DVRs in the UK for other digital platforms, including free satellite, terrestrial, cable and IPTV.

A technical issue caused TiVo Suggestions to stop recording for S1 UK TiVo customers in late September 2008, but this was fixed in late January 2009.

Since December 2010, UK TiVo units that were not already on an active monthly subscription or lifetime subscription could no longer be re-activated. This was due to the closure of analogue terrestrial transmission starting in 2007 and ending in Northern Ireland towards the end of 2012 as part of the UK's digital switchover programme and lead to the obsolescence of theTiVo S1 as it only featured an analogue tuner.

The TiVo S1 subscription service was maintained for both lifetime and monthly subscriptions until 1 June 2011. A community project known as AltEPG was established in March 2011 with the aim of providing a replacement for the discontinued subscription service. This project now provides programme guide data and software upgrades for S1 TiVos.

On 24 November 2009, cable television provider Virgin Media entered into a strategic partnership with TiVo. Under the mutually exclusive agreement, TiVo developed a converged television and broadband interactive interface to power Virgin Media's next generation, high definition set top boxes. TiVo will become the exclusive provider of middleware and user interface software for Virgin Media's next generation set top boxes. Virgin Media will be the exclusive distributor of TiVo services and technology in the United Kingdom. Virgin Media released its first TiVo co-branded product in December 2010. On 17 March 2011, Virgin Media enabled access to a third tuner.

As of 12 February 2015, Virgin Media has 2 million TiVo customers, 50% of their TV customers.

In November 2020, Virgin Media launched Virgin TV 360, beginning to move away from TiVo.

From July 2025, Virgin Media offered customers a free over-the-air software update from TiVo to Virgin TV 360, and announced that certain services would no longer function on TiVo, such as BBC iPlayer.

== Hardware ==
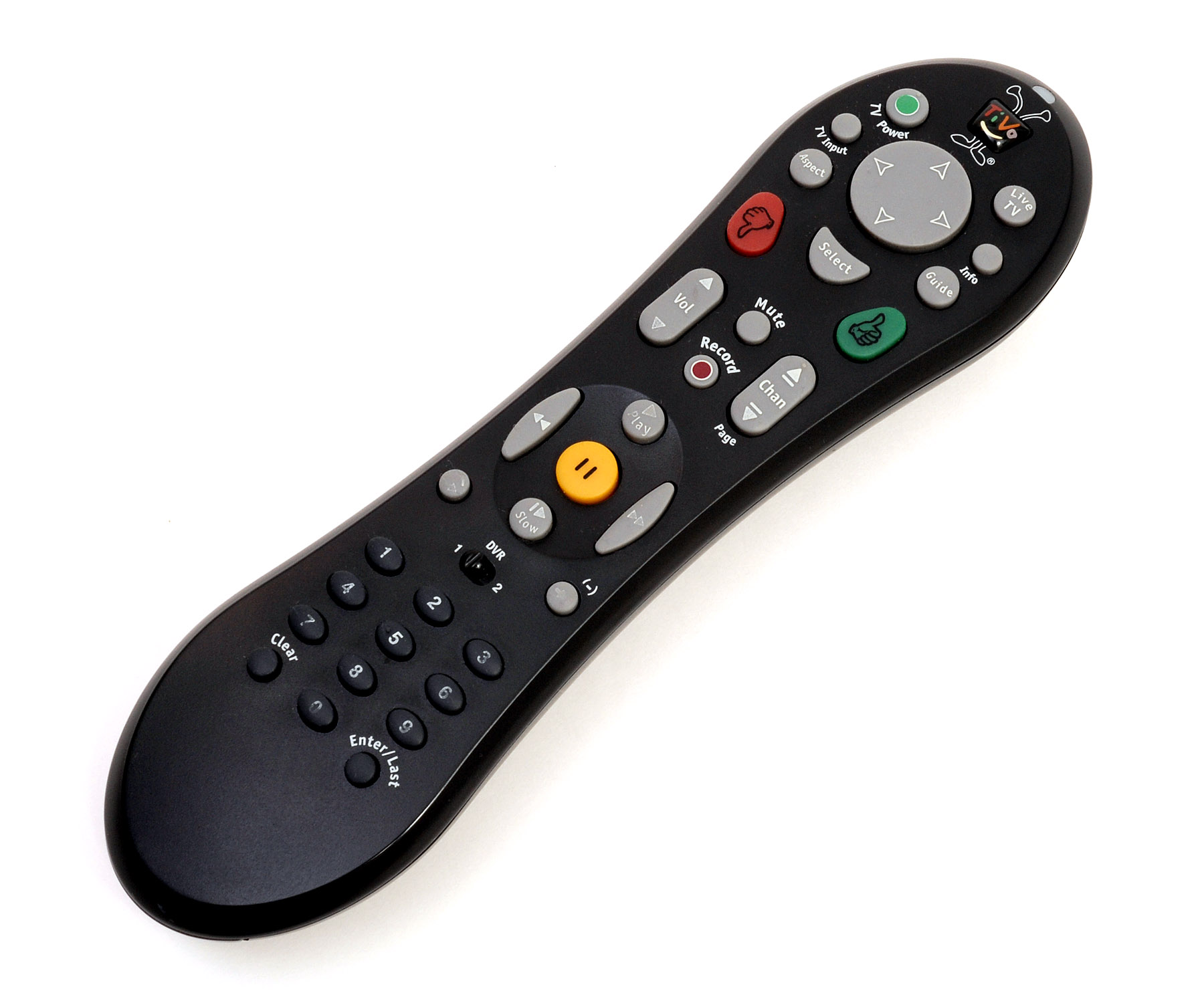
The TiVo "peanut" remote

The TiVo DVR was designed by TiVo Inc., which currently provides the hardware design and Linux-based TiVo software, and operates a subscription service (without which most models of TiVo will not operate). TiVo units have been manufactured by various OEMs, including Philips, Sony, Cisco, Hughes, Pioneer, Toshiba, and Humax, which license the software from TiVo Inc. To date, there have been six "series" of TiVo units produced.

TiVo DVRs are based on PowerPC (Series1) or MIPS (Series2) processors connected to MPEG-2 encoder/decoder chips and high-capacity IDE/ATA hard drives. Series1 TiVo units used one or two drives of 13–60 GB; Series2 units have drives of 40–250 GB in size. TiVo has also partnered with Western Digital to create an external hard drive, the My DVR Expander, for TiVo HD and Series3 Boxes. It plugs into the TiVo box using an eSATA interface. It expands the High-Definition boxes by up to 67 hours of HD, and around 300 hours of standard programming. Other TiVo users have found many ways to expand TiVo storage, although these methods are not supported by TiVo, and may void the warranty.

Some recent models manufactured by Toshiba, Pioneer, and Humax, under license from TiVo, contain DVD-R/RW drives. The models can transfer recordings from the built-in hard drive to DVD Video compliant disc, playable in most modern DVD systems.

Most standalone TiVo DVRs have coax/RF-in and an internal cable-ready tuner, as well as analog video input — composite/RCA and S-Video, for use with an external cable box or satellite receiver. The TiVo unit can use a serial cable or infrared blasters to control the external receiver. They have coax/RF, composite/RCA, and S-Video output (newer models have HDMI output for video and audio), and the DVD systems also have component out. Audio is RCA stereo, and the DVD systems also have digital optical out.

Until 2006, standalone TiVo systems could only record one channel at a time, though a dual-tuner Series2DT (S2DT) box was introduced in April 2006. The S2DT has two internal cable-ready tuners and it supports a single external cable box or satellite receiver. The S2DT is therefore capable of recording two analog cable channels, one analog and one digital cable channel, or one analog cable and one satellite channel at a time, with the correct programming sources. Note, however, that the S2DT, unlike earlier units, cannot record from an antenna. This is due to an FCC mandate that all devices sold after March 2007 with an NTSC tuner must also contain an ATSC tuner. TiVo therefore had to choose between adding ATSC support, or removing NTSC support. With the S2DT they opted to remove NTSC; the Series3 supports NTSC and ATSC, along with digital cable channels (with CableCards).

The Series2 DVRs also have USB ports, currently used only to support network (wired Ethernet and WiFi) adapters. The early Series2 units, models starting with 110/130/140, have USB1.1 hardware, while all other systems have USB2.0. There have been four major generations of Series2 units. The TiVo-branded 1xx and 2xx generations were solid grey-black. The main difference was the upgrade from USB 1.1 to the much faster USB 2.0. The 5xx generation was a new design. The chassis is silver with a white oval in the faceplate. The white oval is backlit, leading to these units being called "Nightlight" boxes. The 5xx generation was designed to reduce costs, and this also caused a noticeable drop in performance in the system menus as well as a large performance drop in network transfers. The 5xx generation also introduced changes in the boot PROM that make them unmodifiable without extensive wiring changes. The 6xx generation resembles the previous 5xx model, except that it has a black oval. The 6xx is a new design and the only model available today is the S2DT with dual tuners and a built-in 10/100baseT Ethernet port as well. The 6xx is the best performing Series2 to date, outperforming even the old leader, the 2xx, and far better than the lowest performing 5xx.

Some TiVo systems are integrated with DirecTV receivers. These "DirecTiVo" recorders record the incoming satellite MPEG-2 digital stream directly to hard disk without conversion. Because of this and the fact that they have two tuners, DirecTiVos are able to record two programs at once. In addition, the lack of digital conversion allows recorded video to be of the same quality as live video. DirecTiVos have no MPEG encoder chip, and can only record DirecTV streams. However, DirecTV has disabled the networking capabilities on their systems, meaning DirecTiVo does not offer such features as multi-room viewing or TiVoToGo. Only the standalone systems can be networked without additional unsupported hacking.

DirecTiVo units (HR10-250) can record HDTV to a 250 GB hard drive, both from the DirecTV stream and over-the-air via a standard UHF- or VHF-capable antenna. They have two virtual tuners (each consisting of a DirecTV tuner paired with an ATSC over-the-air tuner) and, like the original DirecTiVo, can record two programs at once; further, the program guide is integrated between over-the-air and DirecTV so that all programs can be recorded and viewed in the same manner.

In 2005, DirecTV stopped marketing recorders powered by TiVo and focused on its own DVR line developed by its business units. DirecTV continues to support the existing base of DirecTV recorders powered by TiVo.

On 8 July 2006, DirecTV announced an upgrade to version 6.3 on all remaining HR10-250 DirecTiVo receivers, the first major upgrade since this unit was released. This upgrade includes features like program grouping (folders), a much faster on-screen guide, and new sorting features.

In September 2008, DirecTV and TiVo announced that they have extended their current agreement, which includes the development, marketing and distribution of a new HD DIRECTV DVR featuring the TiVo service, as well as the extension of mutual intellectual property arrangements.

Since the discontinued Hughes Electronics DirecTV DVR with TiVo model HR10-250, all TiVo units have been fully HDTV capable. Other TiVo models will only record analog standard definition television (NTSC or PAL/SECAM). The Series3 "TiVo HD, and TiVo HD XL" DVRs and the Series4 "TiVo Premiere and TiVo Premiere XL" DVRs are capable of recording HDTV both from antenna (over the air) and cable (unencrypted QAM tuner or encrypted with a Cable Card) in addition to normal standard definition television from the same sources. Unlike the HR10-250, neither the Series3 nor Series4 units can record from the DirecTV service; conversely, the HR10-250 cannot record from digital cable. Other TiVo models may be connected to a high definition television (HDTV), but are not capable of recording HDTV signals, although they may be connected to a cable HDTV set-top box and record the down-converted outputs.

In 2008, some cable companies started to deploy switched digital video (SDV) technology, which initially was incompatible with the Series3 and TiVo HD units. TiVo Inc worked with cable operators on a tuning-adapter with USB connection to the TiVo to enable SDV. Some MSOs now offer these adapters for free to their customers with TiVo DVRs.

=== Drive expansion ===
TiVo has partnered with Western Digital to create an external hard drive, the My DVR Expander eSATA Edition, for TiVo HD and Series3 systems. The external drive plugs into the TiVo box using an eSATA interface. The first version of the eSATA drive shipped was a 500 GB drive that shipped in June 2008. In June 2009 the 1 TB version of the drive began shipping. The 1 TB version expands the TiVo HD and Series3 systems' capacity by up to 140 hours of HD content or 1,200 hours of standard programming.

TiVo was not designed to have an external drive disconnected once it has been added, because data for each recording is spread across both the internal and external disk drives. As a result, it is not possible to disconnect the external drive without deleting content recorded after the external drive was added. If disconnected, any recordings made will not be usable on either the internal or external drives. However, the external drive may be removed (along with content) without losing settings.

Various capacities of external drives have been shipped since the product was initially released. There were reports of product reliability issues, and a brief period of unavailability.

The Western Digital 1 TB and 500 GB My DVR Expander eSATA Edition and My DVR Expander USB Edition drives have been discontinued and replaced with the Western Digital My Book AV DVR Expander 1 TB drive. This drive has received a facelift from the previous generation, which now sports a glossy finish, and a tiny white LED power indicator, along with a push button power switch in the back. The biggest change is that this drive now includes both eSATA and USB in one device. This device is DirectTV, Dish Network, TiVo, Moxi, Pace, and Scientific Atlanta (Cisco) certified. Seagate has come out with their own DVR-oriented drive called the Seagate GoFlex DVR which comes in a 1 TB and 2 TB capacity. TiVo has not approved the Seagate product for use with TiVo DVRs and they will not currently function with any TiVo products.

=== Hacking ===
Users have installed additional or larger hard drives in their TiVo boxes to increase their recording capacity. Others have designed and built Ethernet cards and a Web interface (TiVoWeb), and figured out how to extract, insert and transfer video among their TiVo boxes. Other hacks include adding time to the start and end of recording intelligently and sending daily e-mails of the TiVo's activity.

TiVo still uses the same encoding, however, for the media files (saved as .TiVo files). These are MPEG files encoded with the user's Media Access Key (MAK). However, software developers have written programs such as tivodecode and tivodecode Manager to strip the MAK from the file, allowing the user to watch or send the recordings to friends.

=== TiVo in the cloud ===
On January 4, 2018, TiVo announced its next-gen platform, a catch-all product for providers like cable companies. It's available for multiple TV devices, including not only Linux- and Android TV-based set-top boxes and traditional DVRs, but also DVR-free streaming devices like Apple TV and Amazon's Fire TV, as well as phones, tablets and PCs. The platform allows providers to take advantage of TiVo's user interface, voice control, personalization and recommendations. TiVo expects its user interface could provide an advantage over competitors such as Netflix, Hulu, and Amazon Video "in a world where cord-cutting is increasingly popular."

In the 2020s, Internet service providers such as TDS and Astound started using set-top boxes with TiVo user interfaces to provide TV and cloud DVR service to their customers. These devices can also run apps for streaming services such as Netflix and Prime Video.

== Marketing and branding ==
Created in 1998 by Michael Cronan and graphics design firm Pittard Sullivan, TiVo, better known as TiVo Guy, is the mascot and logo of the DVR brand and the two former companies containing the same name. TiVo is a black anthropomorphic television set with two antlike antennae and a pair of legs and large toeless feet. He currently wears a white mask and has two large eyes on his face.

Originally, he was much more similar to mascots such as Mickey Mouse, whom Cronan wanted him to resemble. Several different drafts of the character were created. One draft was designed with colored letters of his name spelled out on his face with a custom font that was supposed to mimic a kid's handwriting. A white smile was then added to complete a face for TiVo and give him his happy attitude with a bit of personality. This version was approved by the rest of the design team and was utilized when TiVo Inc. launched their first DVR in 1999.

Prior to Xperi purchasing TiVo Corporation in 2019, he was designed more corporately as a simplistic logo. This drastic change happened in 2015, replacing the original design with a silhouette employees referred to as Blankman.

Throughout his existence, TiVo has featured and starred in advertising, promotional videos, and the iconic bootup animations found on the signature DVR manufactured by Xperi.

== Competitors and market share ==
While its former main competitor in the United States, ReplayTV, had adopted a commercial-skip feature, TiVo decided to avoid automatic implementation fearing such a move might provoke backlash from the television industry. ReplayTV was sued over this feature as well as the ability to share shows over the Internet, and these lawsuits contributed to the bankruptcy of SONICblue, its owner at the time. Its new owner, DNNA, dropped both features in the final ReplayTV model, the 5500.

After demonstrating the WebTV capability at the same 1999 CES with TiVo and ReplayTV demonstrating their products, Dish (then named Dish Network) a few months later added DVR functionality to their DishPlayer 7100 (and later its 7200) with its Echostar unit producing the hardware while Microsoft provided the software that included WebTV, the same software Microsoft would later use for its UltimateTV DVR for DirecTV. The TiVo, ReplayTV, and DishPlayer 7100 represent very first DVRs that were in development at the same time and were released to market at about the same time.

SONICblue, the owners of ReplayTV would file for bankruptcy after being sued for its ability to automatically skip commercials and other features that were thought to violate copyrights; Echostar (Dish) would eventually sue Microsoft in 2001 for failing to support the software in DishPlayer 7100 and 7200 with Dish ending their relationship with Microsoft and cease offering the DishPlayer 7100/7200 to its subscribers and, instead, produce their own in-house DVR; and DirecTV would eventually drop Microsoft's UltimateTV and keep DirecTiVo as its only DVR offering for quite some time.

Other distributors' competing DVR sets in the United States include Comcast and Verizon, although both distribute third-party hardware from manufacturers such as Motorola and the former Scientific Atlanta unit of Cisco Systems with this functionality built-in. Verizon uses boxes fitted for FiOS, allowing high-speed Internet access and other features. However, TiVo is compatible with the FiOS TV service because when the TV programming arrives at the home via FiOS Fiber to the Home network, it is converted to CableLabs specification QAM channels exactly as those used by cable TV companies. AT&T is an IPTV service that is incompatible with the TiVo.

Despite having gained 234,000 subscribers in the last quarter of 2011, as of January 2012 TiVo had only (approximately) 2.3 million subscribers in the United States. This is down from a peak of 4.36 million in January 2006. As of January 31, 2016, TiVo reported 6.8 million subscribers.

== Issues ==
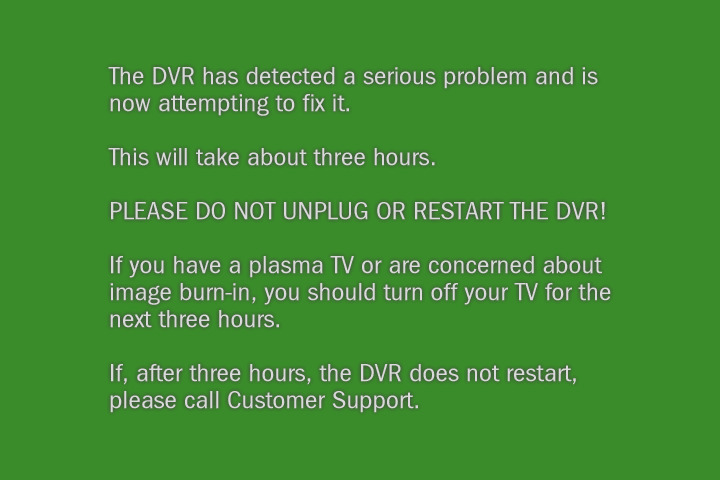
Green screen of death encountered for serious errors on TiVo devices

=== Privacy concerns ===
TiVo collects detailed usage data from units via broadband Internet. As units are downloading schedule data, they transmit household viewing habits to TiVo Inc. Collected information includes a log of everything watched (time and channel) and remote keypresses such as fast forwarding through or replaying content. Many users were surprised when TiVo released data on how many users rewatched the exposure of Janet Jackson's breast during the 2004 Super Bowl. TiVo records usage data for their own research and they also sell it to other corporations such as advertisers. Nielsen and TiVo have also previously collaborated to track viewing habits. This data is sold to advertising agencies as a way of documenting the number of viewers watching specific commercials to their corporate clients.

TiVo has three levels of data collection. By default, the user is in "opt-out" status, where all usage data is aggregated by ZIP Code, and individual viewing habits are not tracked. Certain optional features and promotions require the user to opt in, and individual information is then collected for targeted show suggestions or advertising. Users can request that TiVo block the collection of anonymous viewing information and diagnostic information from their TiVo DVR.

=== Litigation ===
TiVo holds several patents regarding digital video recorder technology, including one for its "Time Warp" feature, which have been asserted against cable TV operators and competing DVR box makers.

=== Opposition by content providers ===
==== Content flagging ====
In September 2005, a TiVo software upgrade added the ability for broadcasters to "flag" programs to be deleted after a certain date. Some customers had recordings deleted, or could not use their flagged recordings (transfer to a computer or burn to DVD), as they could with unflagged material. The initial showing of this for random shows was a bug in the software. It later was enabled on pay-per-view and video-on-demand content.

==== Pop-up advertisements ====
During early 2005, TiVo began test marketing "pop-up" advertisements to select subscribers, to explore it as an alternative source of revenue. The idea was that as users fast-forward through certain commercials of TiVo advertisers, they would also see a static image ad more suitable and effective than the broken video stream.

At its announcement, the concept of extra advertisements drew heavy criticism from subscribers. Some lifetime subscribers were upset that they had already paid for a service based upon their previous ad-free experience, while others argued that they had purchased the service for the specific purpose of dodging advertisements. In 2007, TiVo made changes to its pop-up ad system to show pop-up ads only if the user fast-forwards through a commercial that has a corresponding pop-up ad.

In 2019, some TiVo DVRs began running "pre-roll advertisements." These ads are short, but mandatory. The ads run before the user can play a recorded program. The ads are downloaded from the Internet, so a brief delay occurs before the mandatory ads begin, further delaying playback. Only TiVo DVRs using TiVo Experience 4 software (Roamio, Bolt, Edge, etc.) have this forced advertising, earlier TiVo software does not deploy pre-roll ads.

=== GNU General Public License and Tivoization ===
In 2006, the Free Software Foundation decided to combat TiVo's technical system of blocking users from running modified software.

This behavior, which Richard Stallman dubbed Tivoization, was tackled by creating a new version of the GNU General Public License, the GNU GPLv3, which prohibits this activity.

The kernel of the operating system of TiVo-branded hardware, the Linux kernel, is distributed under the terms of the GNU GPLv2. The FSF's goal is to ensure that all recipients of software licensed under the GPLv3 are not restricted by hardware constraints on the modification of distributed software.

This new license provision was acknowledged by TiVo in its April 2007 SEC filing: "we may be unable to incorporate future enhancements to the GNU/Linux operating system into our software, which could adversely affect our business".

=== CableCard Support Uncertainty (USA) ===
In September 2020, the Federal Communications Commission (FCC) changed its rules so that cable television providers no longer must support CableCard. Providers may choose to keep supporting CableCard, but TiVo owners have no assurance. The cable television provider may discontinue CableCard support at any time.

== In popular culture ==
TiVo has been referenced or depicted numerous times in several movies and TV shows, and their mascot even starred in his own short film directed by Adam Green of ArieScope Pictures.

== See also ==
- TiVo digital video recorders
