= Xperi =

American technology company

Xperi Inc.
- Formerly: Tessera Holding Corporation (1990–2017); Xperi Holding Corporation (2017–2022)
- Type: Public
- Traded as: NYSE: XPER
- Industry: Technology, Pay television, Consumer electronics
- Founded: 1990; 36 years ago
- Headquarters: San Jose, California, U.S.
- Area served: Worldwide
- Key people: Dave Habiger (chairman); Jon Kirchner (CEO)
- Brands: DTS; TiVo; IMAX Enhanced; HD Radio
- Revenue: ▲US$521 million (2023)
- Operating income: ▼US$−749 million (2022)
- Net income: ▼US$−757 million (2022)
- Total assets: ▼US$737 million (2022)
- Total equity: ▼US$463 million (2022)
- Number of employees: c. 2,100 (2022)
- Website: xperi.com

Xperi Inc. is an American multinational technology company headquartered in San Jose, California, that develops software for consumer electronics and connected cars, as well as media platforms for video service over broadband. The company is organized into four business units: Pay TV, Consumer Electronics, Connected Car, and Media Platform. Xperi's brands include DTS, HD Radio, and TiVo.

Xperi Inc. was formerly part of Xperi Holding Corporation, which was itself the result of several mergers and acquisitions over many years, including publicly traded firms such as DTS, Inc. and TiVo Corporation.

== History ==
Xperi Holding Corporation traces its roots to Tessera, Inc., which was founded in 1990 and renamed Tessera Technologies, Inc. prior to its initial public offering in 2003. Tessera developed chip-scale packaging technologies that were broadly licensed in the semiconductor industry.

In 2008, Tessera acquired FotoNation, which specialized in image enhancement and analysis, and in 2016 acquired DTS, Inc., an audio technologies company. DTS had previously acquired iBiquity Digital Corporation in 2015, which developed the North American digital audio broadcast standard HD Radio.

After acquiring DTS in December 2016, Tessera Technologies, Inc. became Tessera Holding Corporation, and two months later began operating under the new corporate name Xperi Corporation.

On December 19, 2019, Xperi Corporation and TiVo Corporation announced their intent to merge. The merger was completed on June 1, 2020. The combined entity operated under the name Xperi Holding Corporation, and became one of the largest intellectual property (IP) and product licensing companies in the world. On October 1, 2022, the product business of Xperi Holding Corporation was separated from the IP licensing business and spun off as a standalone public company named Xperi Inc., trading on the New York Stock Exchange under the ticker symbol XPER. At the same time, Xperi Corporation, consisting of the remaining IP licensing business, changed its name to Adeia Inc. and began trading on the Nasdaq Stock Market under the ticker symbol ADEA.

In May 2021, TiVo Corporation, a wholly owned subsidiary of Xperi Holding Corporation, agreed to acquire MobiTV assets from Chapter 11 bankruptcy. In July 2022, Xperi Holding Corporation acquired Vewd Software.

== Products ==
Xperi's products are organized across four business units: Pay TV, Consumer Electronics, Connected Car, and Media Platform.

=== Pay TV ===
The Pay TV business unit includes Classic Guides, which provides interactive programming guides for linear TV through set-top boxes, and Personalized Content Discovery (PCD), a content discovery platform that provides metadata, search, and recommendations technology for content across linear TV, subscription, and internet-delivered programming. The unit also offers an IPTV platform delivering streaming video services and interactive programming guides across IP networks, available as either a fully managed service or a software download to set-top box, mobile, or web devices. Consumer Hardware and Subscriptions encompasses TiVo DVR hardware and subscriptions, while TiVo+ is a free ad-supported streaming service offering more than 150 channels of TV and video on demand content.

=== Consumer Electronics ===
The Consumer Electronics business unit is centered on audio technologies developed under the DTS brand. DTS:X is a high-definition audio codec supporting the creation, distribution, and playback of immersive audio for cinema and consumer electronics including TVs, soundbars, AV equipment, laptops, tablets, and other mobile devices. DTS Headphone:X is a spatial audio technology that renders immersive audio from movies, music, and gaming on headphones. IMAX Enhanced is a partnership between IMAX Corporation and DTS that brings immersive cinema technology to consumer electronics, laptops, desktops, and certain portable devices. DTS Play-Fi is a whole-home wireless audio technology for consumer electronic devices.

=== Connected Car ===
The Connected Car business unit includes HD Radio, the broadcast standard for North American digital radio across the FM and AM bands, and DTS AutoStage, an in-cabin entertainment platform that combines broadcast radio, music, video, and gaming delivered across IP networks to automobiles.

=== Media Platform ===
The Media Platform business unit is anchored by the TiVo Operating System (TiVo OS), a smart TV operating system that aggregates content across SVOD, AVOD, and FAST channels using personalized content discovery and voice navigation. The unit also encompasses advertising monetization, which generates revenue from in-guide ad units and ad-supported content across platforms including Classic Guides, TiVo OS, TiVo+, and PCD, as well as a metadata service providing data about music and video content, including The Movie Database (TMDB) through Rovi.
