= Xuejiagang site =

Archaeological site in China

Xuejiagang Site
- 薛家岗遗址 (Japanese)
- Location within China
- 30°33′17.3″N 116°35′26.9″E
- Type: ruins
- Periods: Neolithic
- Cultures: Xuejiagang Culture
- Location: Qianshan County, Anqing, Anhui, China

History
- Built: 3500 BC
- Abandoned: 2800 BC

Site notes
- Area: 6 ha (15 acres)
- Excavation dates: 1979, 1980, 1981, 1982, 2000
- Discovered: 1977

The Xuejiagang site is a Neolithic Chinese archaeological site. Located near Wanghe Town in Qianshan County, Anqing, it covers an area of over 60,000 square meters. It is located at the junction of the Yonggang and Lihua villages, about 7 kilometres (4.3 mi) north of the downtown.

Following its discovery in 1979, over 2,000 square metres (22,000 sq ft) of the site have been uncovered, along with nearly 3,000 artifacts. It is located near the confluence of the Qian and Wanhe Rivers on a narrow mound.

== History ==
The Neolithic remains at Xuejiagang are separated into six periods, the first five belonging to the Xuejiagang culture, while the sixth belongs to the later Zhangsidun Culture. The first five periods can be further divided into early and late periods, with the early period being from around 3500-3300 BC, while the late period is around 3300-2800 BC.

The soil structure indicates five cultural layers. The first layer is cultivated soil, the second layer was dated to the Tang and Song dynasties. The third layer is from the Xia and Shang dynasties, while the fourth and fifth layers are Neolithic.

The fourth and fifth layers indicate a shift in Neolithic people from their former nomadic style to a more settled and agriculture-centric style of living.

== Geography ==
The site itself covers an area of approximately 300,000 m^{2} (3,200,000 sq ft), while the mound stretches from west to east, resembling a dragon's head. Most of the Xuejiagang culture was located in the slopes of the Dabie Mountains, the Wanhe River basin, along with Wuchang Lake and Po Lake. Its diversity is closely related to the Liangzhu culture in the nearby Taihu Lake area.

== Archaeology ==
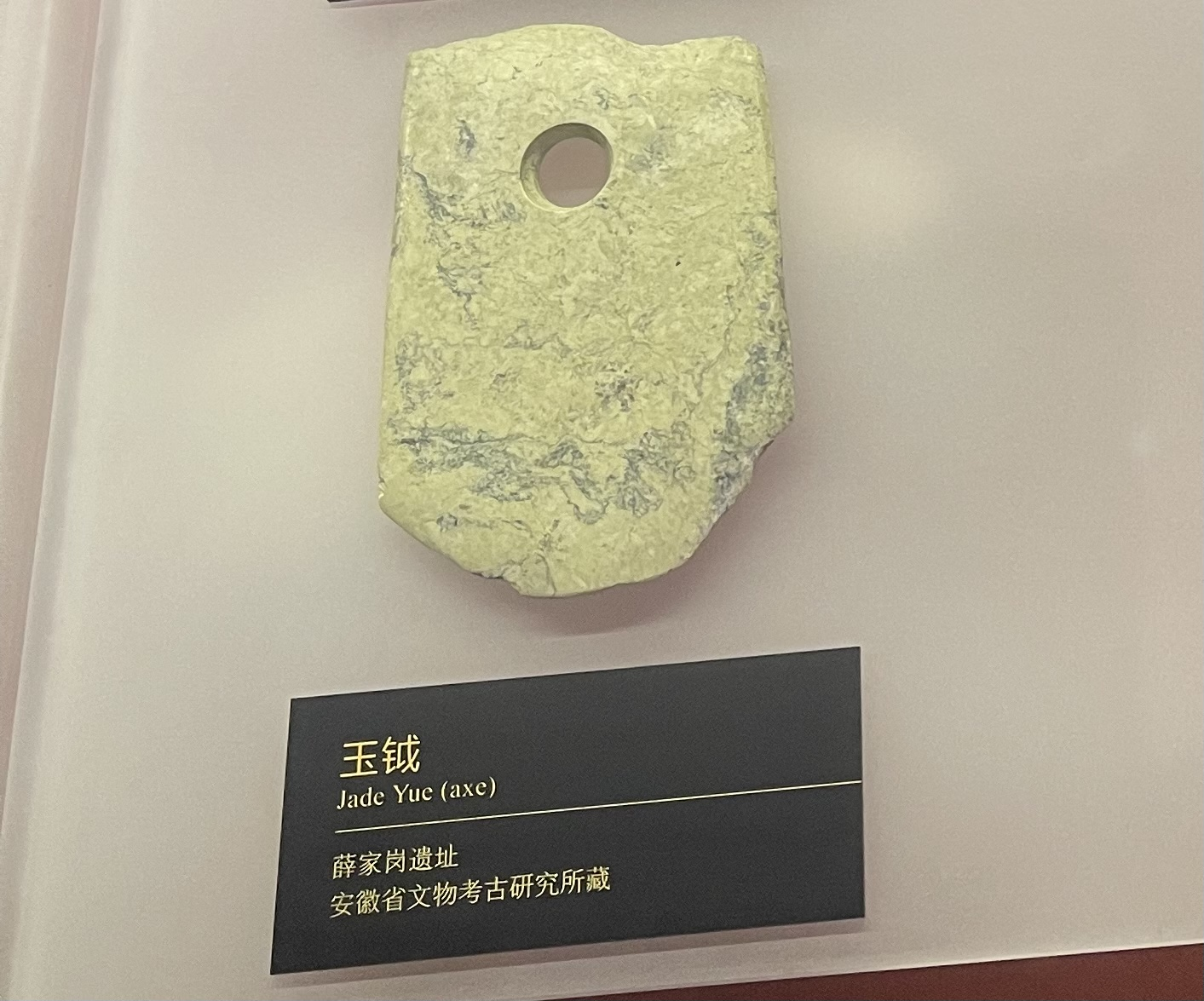
Jade axe head from the Xuejiagang site

In December 1977, the Qianshan County Cultural Center discovered the site during a relic survey, after which the Anhui Provincial Cultural Relics Team conducted several investigations, deducing the site's Neolithic origins.

The first five excavations of the site occurred in the spring and autumn of 1979, 1980, 1981, and 1982, respectively. Over 144 Neolithic tombs were uncovered, along with house sites and ash pits.

Most of the relics unearthed were either pottery, stoneware, or jade. The final excavation occurred in the autumn of 2000, where a team conducted a trial excavation of the Yongxing site in the general area, expanding the Xuejiagang site further.

The most unique artifacts from the site are the large stone knives that contain up to 13 holes. The position of the drilling of the knives indicate an accuracy of less than 1 millimetre (0.039 in), making it unique among most excavated sites in China. One of the knives is on display at the National Museum of China.
