= Sanzu Temple =

Buddhist temple on Mount Tianzhu, China

- 三祖寺

Religion
- Affiliation: Buddhism
- Sect: Chan Buddhism
- Leadership: Shi Kuanrong (释宽容)

Location
- Location: Mount Tianzhu, Qianshan, Anhui
- Country: China
- Interactive map of Sanzu Temple
- Coordinates: 30°40′18″N 116°30′08″E

Architecture
- Style: Chinese architecture
- Founder: Baozhi (宝志)
- Established: 505
- Completed: 1944 (reconstruction)

Website
- www.sanzusi.com

Sanzu Temple (Chinese: 三祖寺; pinyin: Sānzǔ Sì; lit. 'Temple of the Third Patriarch') is a Buddhist temple located on Mount Tianzhu, in Qianshan, Anhui, China. Originally built in 505 in the Northern and Southern dynasties (420–589), the temple has a history of over 1550 years, but it was destroyed and rebuilt many times because of war and natural disasters. The present version was completed in 1944.

== History ==
=== Liang dynasty ===
The temple was originally built in 505 by monk Baozhi (宝志) during the Liang dynasty (502–557). It was initially called "Bodhi Temple" (菩提庵). In 536, Emperor Wu of Liang (502–557) named it "Shangu Temple" (山谷寺).

=== Sui dynasty ===
After Yang Jian ascending the throne, the founder of the Sui dynasty (589–618), Emperor Wen (581–604) immediately abolished the policy of destroying Buddha statues during the Northern Zhou (557–581). Emperor Wendi ordered to rebuild temples and restore Buddha statues and sutras. After completing studies under Dazu Huike, Sengcan, the third Patriarch, settled at the temple in 590, where he taught Chan Buddhism for years.

=== Tang dynasty ===
In 745, in the reign of Emperor Xuanzong of Tang (712–756), the local official Li Chang built a stupa for preserving the śarīras of Master Sengcan.

In 758, Emperor Suzong (756–763) renamed it "Sanzu Shangu Ganyuan Chan Temple" (三祖山谷干元禅寺).

In 772, Emperor Daizong (763–779) honored the Buddhist stupa, "Jueji Stupa" (觉寂塔).

Since Emperor Wuzong (814–846) was a staunch Taoist and due to socio-economic reasons, he ordered to demolish Buddhist temples, confiscate temple lands and force monks to return to secular life. The massive movement was known as the "Great Anti-Buddhist Persecution" or "Huichang Suppression of Buddhism" (会昌毁佛) in Chinese. Sanzu Temple was badly damaged in this massive movement.

In 847, in the ruling of Emperor Xuanzong (847–860), the temple was restored and refurbished.

=== Song dynasty ===
In 1028, in the 6th year of Emperor Renzong of Song (1023–1032), the empress dowager gave a sacred tooth relic to the temple and donated property to establish the Zishou Pagoda (资寿塔).

=== Yuan dynasty ===
After Song dynasty, the temple went into decline and was incredibly disappeared during the whole Yuan dynasty (1271–1368).

=== Ming dynasty ===
In 1425, during the reign of the Hongxi Emperor of the Ming dynasty (1368–1644), abbot Puju (普聚) renovated and restored the temple.

During the reign of the Chenghua Emperor (1465–1487), local official Pan Jian (潘鉴) appropriated a large sum of money for constructing the temple.

In 1635 in the late Ming dynasty, the temple was gradually fell into ruin due to the civil war between Zhang Xianzhong, the leader of roving bandits, and the Ming imperial army.

=== Qing dynasty ===
During the Kangxi and Qianlong periods of the Qing dynasty, abbots Poyin (破闇) and Zhihai (智海) raised funds to restore the temple.

In 1860, the temple was devastated by war between the Taiping Rebellion and the Qing army.

=== Republic of China ===
In 1944, a year before the Chinese Civil War, abbot Yuehai (月海) supervised the reconstruction of Sanzu Temple.

=== People's Republic of China ===
The temple was designated as a National Key Buddhist Temple in Han Chinese Area by the State Council of China in 1983.

== Architecture ==
Now the existing main buildings include Shanmen, Heavenly Kings Hall, Mahavira Hall, Thousand Buddha Hall, Hall of Guru and Jueji Stupa (觉寂塔).

=== Hall of Four Heavenly Kings ===
Maitreya is enshrined in the Hall of Four Heavenly Kings and at the back of his statue is a statue of Skanda. Statues of Four Heavenly Kings are enshrined in the left and right side of the hall.

=== Mahavira Hall ===
The Mahavira Hall was built by abbot Yuehai in 1944. In the center of the hall enshrines the statue of Sakyamuni with Ānanda and Kāśyapa Buddha on the left and right. At the back of the hall are placed the statues of Guanyin, Sudhana (Chinese: 善财童子; pinyin: Shàncáitóngzǐ), and Longnü.

=== Thousand Buddha Hall ===
The Thousand Buddha Hall enshrining a wood carving statue of Vairocana. In the four interior walls one thousand miniature Buddha statues are inlaid in the alcoves.

=== Hall of Guru ===
The Hall of Guru houses statues of Bodhidharma, Dazu Huike, Sengcan, with a bronze statue of Baozhi at the back.

=== Jueji Stupa ===
The Jueji Stupa (觉寂塔), more commonly known as "Sanzu Stupa" (三祖塔), was originally constructed in 745 in the Tang dynasty. It was completely destroyed by the Red Guards in the ten-year Cultural Revolution.
