= Longquan Temple =

Longquan Temple may refer to:

- Longquan Monastery (龙泉寺), a Buddhist temple in Beijing, China
- Longquan Temple (Yuyao) (龙泉寺), a Buddhist temple in Yuyao, Zhejiang, China
- Longquan Temple (Yunnan) (龙泉观), a Taoist temple in Kunming, Yunnan, China
