= Wu Yun =

Wu Yun may refer to:

- Wu Zixu (died 484 BC), also known as Wu Yun, a Chinese general of the Wu kingdom.
- Wu Yun (Tang dynasty), a Tang dynasty poet and Taoist mystic.
- Wu Yun (Qing dynasty), a Qing dynasty politician.
