= Xiaodao Lun =

570 critique of Daoism

- Traditional Chinese: 笑道論
- Simplified Chinese: 笑道论
- Literal meaning: Laughing at the Daoists
Transcriptions
Standard Mandarin
- Hanyu Pinyin: Xiàodào Lùn
- Wade–Giles: Hsiao^{4}-tao^{4} Lun^{4}
- IPA: [ɕjâʊ.tâʊ lwə̂n]

The Xiaodao Lun is an anti-Daoist polemic written in 570 for the Emperor Wu of Northern Zhou (543–578) by the Buddhist courtier Zhen Luan. After holding several inconclusive debates in the court, Emperor Wu commissioned the Xiaodao Lun as one of two reports examining the suitability of sponsoring either Buddhism or Daoism as a state religion for the Northern Zhou dynasty, with a view towards unifying China. The Xiaodao Lun mocked Daoist practices, accused Daoists of plagiarizing Buddhist texts, and portrayed the religion as dangerous to social stability. Its advice was disregarded by the Emperor, who supported the preservation of Daoism, but his dynasty was ultimately short-lived. Zhen Luan's Xiaodao Lun is preserved in the Chinese Buddhist canon in fascicle 9 of T2103 and is consulted for its quotations of Daoist texts that have not been preserved until today.

== Background ==
The Buddhist sangha in China held Buddhism to be superior to Daoism, whose canon it regarded as "heretical" (xié 邪) and "false sutra" (wěijīng 伪经). Daoists, for their part, published the Huahujing in the 4th century, which argued that Chinese Buddhism was a simplified form of Daoism, developed during the travels of the Daoist philosopher Laozi while he was in India. One organized Daoist-Buddhist debate was organized in 520 by the Northern Wei dynasty (386–535), and a second was organized in 570 by the Northern Zhou dynasty (557–581), prompted by the proposal by the Buddhist Wei Yuansong (卫元嵩) to make the Emperor a divine Buddhist ruler and to weaken the Buddhist sangha's independence from the state.

The debate was inconclusive, so the Emperor Wu of Northern Zhou (543–578) commissioned comparative reports on the suitability of Buddhism and Daoism as state religions, resulting in the Xiaodao Lun by official Zhen Luan, and Erjiao Lun (二教论) by Dao An. Submitted in 570 as the Xiaodao Lun, Zhen's report denied that Daoism had any value and ridiculed the religion's exorcisms, talismans, and internal inconsistencies.

== Author ==
The author of the Xiaodao Lun was Zhen Luan, an apostate from Daoism who lived during the Northern Zhou dynasty (557–581). Zhen Luan was a scholar-official for Emperor Wu's court who also served as a commandant, mathematician, and astronomer. Zhen trained in a Daoist congregation, but converted to Buddhism out of disgust with Daoist sexual practices. He wrote the Xiaodao Lun after attending three of the Buddhist-Daoist debates sponsored by Emperor Wu.

== Contents ==
The Xiaodan Lun is written in 36 sections in an imitation of the Daoist canon, and aimed to show that the mythology, rituals, and practices of Daoism were inconsistent and absurd. Zhen's text criticizes not those scripture which were most important to contemporary Daoist practice, but those which were easiest to ridicule, such as "The Size of the Sun and the Moon". In addition, the treatise references Daoist texts from the Lingbao and Tianshi schools of Daoism disproportionately to those from the Shangqing school.

The polemic accuses Daoists of "stealing" (qiè 窃) the Buddhist Lotus Sutra for use in Daoist scripture. Zhen further charged the Daoists of not fully understanding the Buddhist texts that they plagiarized. These criticisms prompted some internal Daoist reform, as the Buddhist encyclopedia Fayuan Zhulin (668) noted the replacement of Buddhist terminology in Daoist texts with more native Chinese terms.

The Xiaodao Lun was the most lurid and complete account of Daoist sexual practices that anti-Daoist polemicists used to attack the religion, including group sex and partner swapping. Another argument of the Xiaodao Lun implicated Daoism in general for various peasant revolts, including the Yellow Turban Rebellion (184–205), whose organizers were associated with secret Daoist societies.

== Aftermath of publication ==
The Emperor largely disregarded the conclusions of the Xiaodao Lun, positively interpreting Zhen's examples of alleged Daoist plagiarism of Buddhist texts, as increasing Daoism's appeal as a unifying ideology for the Zhou realm. Emperor Wu went on to found the Tongdao Guan (通道观) for Daoist research, which would eventually compile the first Daoist encyclopedia, the Wushang Biyao (无上秘要). However, Emperor Wu would not achieve his goal of Chinese reunification, which was achieved by the Sui dynasty (581–618), who favored Buddhism over Daoism.

As an apologetic, the Xiaodao Lun is included in the Chinese Buddhist canon. Polemical confrontation between Buddhists and Daoists was limited after the Tang dynasty (618–907), with the last great flareup during the Yuan dynasty (1279–1368). The Yuan debates of 1255 and 1258 concluded in a government-sponsored book burning of Daoist texts and printing materials in 1281. In modern times, the Xiaodao Lun is consulted for its quotations of medieval Daoist scriptures that have not survived court censorship.
