= Buddhism in China =

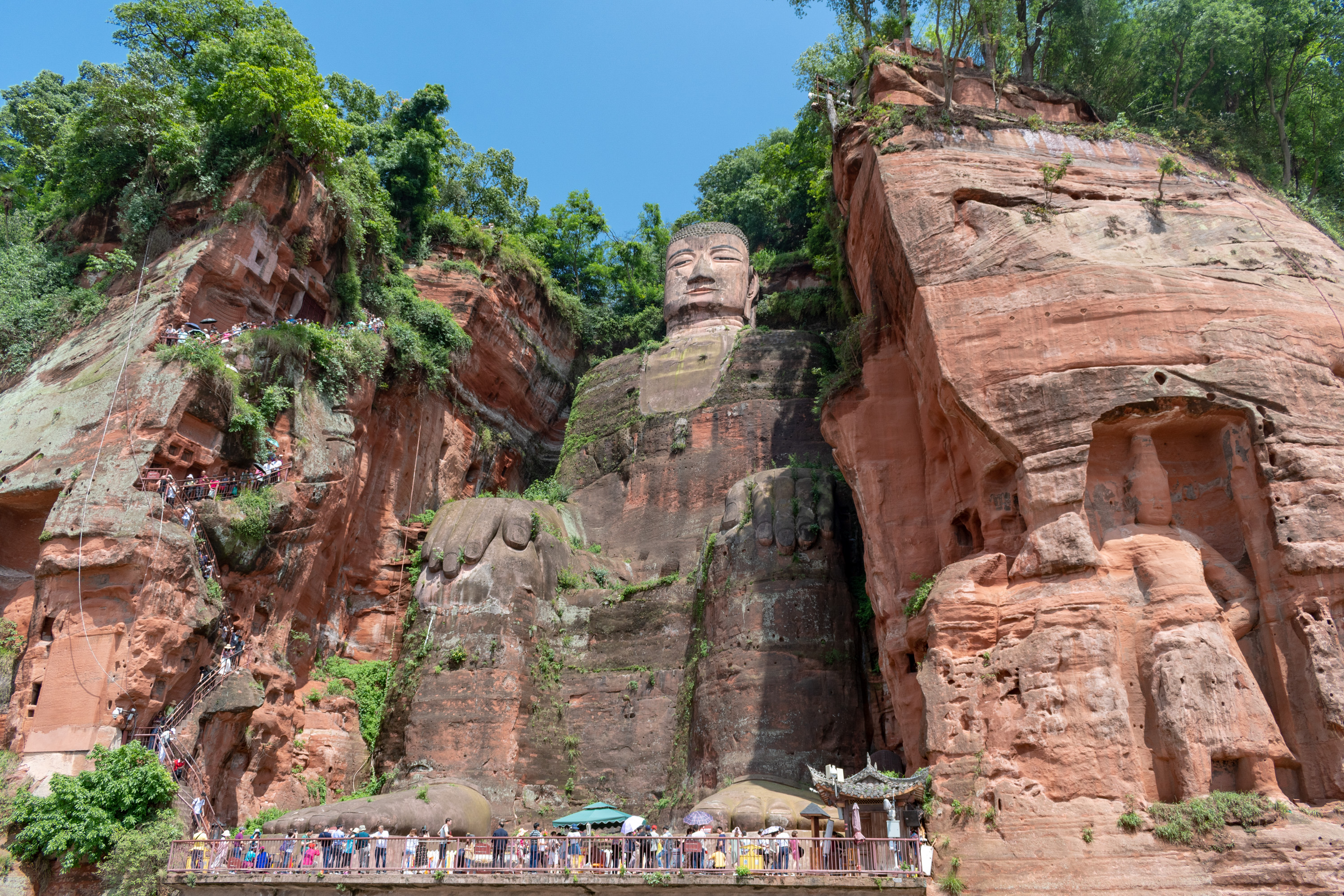
- 71-metre tall Leshan Giant Buddha, a UNESCO World Heritage Site, in Sichuan, China

Total population
- c. 42 million or 4% formally affiliated (Pew Research Center 2023)

Regions with significant populations
- Throughout China

Religions
- Buddhism (mostly East Asian Mahayana)

Languages
- Chinese and other languages

Buddhism is followed by more than 40 million people in China, accounting for around 4% of the country's population. There are three main Buddhist branches there; Han or Chinese Buddhism, Tibetan Buddhism, and Theravada Buddhism. There is no definitive answer to the time when Buddhism was first introduced to China, but it is generally believed that this occurred around the time of the Han dynasty.

== Overview ==
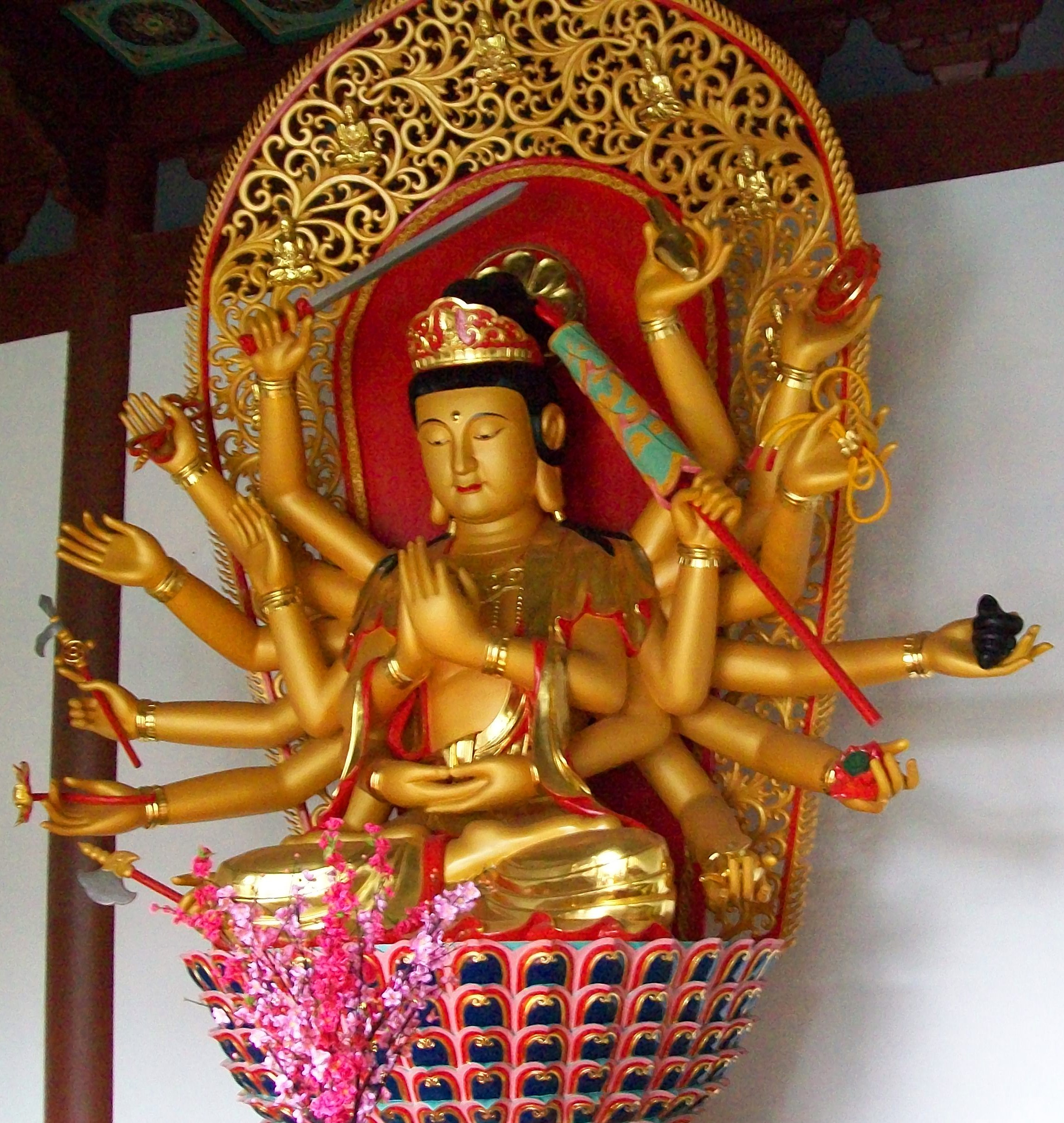
Cundī, an esoteric form of the Bodhisattva Guanyin, at Lingyin Temple in Hangzhou, Zhejiang.

As China's largest officially recognized religion, Buddhists range from 4 to 33 percent, depending on the measurement used and whether it is based on surveys that ask for formal affiliation with Buddhism or Buddhist beliefs and practices. As with Taoism and folk religion in China, estimating the size of the Buddhist population in China is challenging because the boundaries between Buddhism and other traditional Chinese religions are not always clear.

The largest Buddhist branch in China is Han Buddhism, or Chinese Buddhism, which accounts for the vast majority of the country's Buddhists, as measured by the number of registered temples. On the other hand, Tibetan Buddhism and Theravada Buddhism are mainly practiced by ethnic minorities in China living on the Tibetan Plateau, Inner Mongolia, and the southern regions bordering Myanmar and Laos, although there are also other forms of Buddhism practiced by a smaller number of people in China.

With the establishment of the People's Republic of China in 1949, religions came under the control of the new government, and the Buddhist Association of China was founded in 1953. During the Cultural Revolution, Buddhism was suppressed and temples closed or destroyed. Restrictions lasted until the reforms of the 1980s, when Buddhism began to recover popularity and its place as the largest organised faith in the country.

== Forms of Buddhism ==
=== Han Chinese Buddhism ===
Around the first century CE, Buddhism was introduced into China by its western neighboring populations during the Han dynasty, thanks to the first translations of buddhist texts from Classical Sanskrit into Chinese by An Shigao. It became very popular among Chinese of all walks of life; admired by commoners, and sponsored by emperors in certain dynasties. The expansion of Buddhism reached its peak during the Tang dynasty, in the 8th to 9th century, when Buddhist monasteries had become very rich and powerful. The wealth possessed by Buddhist institutions, the negative impact of Buddhist activities on basic social production, and Emperor Wuzong's personal veneration of Taoism were all practical reasons—the ideal reason was that Buddhism was a "foreign religion"—why the Tang emperors decided to enact a wave of persecutions of the religion, starting with the Great Anti-Buddhist Persecution (845) by Emperor Wuzong, through which many monasteries were destroyed and the religion's influence in China was greatly reduced. However, Buddhism survived the persecutions and regained a place in the Chinese society over the following centuries.

Spreading in China, Buddhism had to interact with indigenous religions, especially Taoism. Such interaction gave rise to uniquely Han Chinese Buddhist schools (汉传佛教 Hànchuán Fójiào). Originally seen as a kind of "foreign Taoism", Buddhism's scriptures were translated into Chinese using the Taoist vocabulary. Chan Buddhism in particular was shaped by Taoism, developing distrust of scriptures and even language, as well as typical Taoist views emphasizing "this life", the "moment", and dedicated practices. Throughout the Tang period, Taoism itself developed elements drawn from Buddhism, including monasticism, vegetarianism, abstention from alcohol, and the doctrine of emptiness. During the same period, Chan Buddhism grew to become the largest sect in Chinese Buddhism.

Buddhism was not universally welcomed, particularly among the gentry. The Buddha's teaching seemed alien and amoral to conservative Confucian sensibilities. Confucianism promoted social stability, order, strong families, and practical living, and Chinese officials questioned how monasticism and personal attainment of Nirvana benefited the empire. However, Buddhism and Confucianism eventually reconciled after centuries of conflict and assimilation.

In contemporary China, the most popular forms of Chinese Buddhism are the Pure Land and Chan schools. Pure Land Buddhism is very accessible for common people, since in its doctrine even lay practitioners may escape the cycle of death and rebirth. The goal for followers of this popular form of Buddhism is to be reborn in the Pure Land, which is a place rather than a state of mind. In the 2000s and 2010s, the influence of Chinese Buddhism has been expressed through the construction of large-scale statues, pagodas and temples, including the Great Buddha of the Central Plains, the second highest statue in the world. Many temples in China also claim to preserve relics of the original Gautama Buddha.

The revival of Chinese Buddhism in the 21st century has also seen the development of the Humanistic Buddhist movement, reintroduced from Taiwan and Chinese overseas communities, with organizations such as the Cíjì (慈济), which has been working in mainland China since 1991 and has opened its mainland headquarters in the 2010s in Suzhou.

=== Tibetan Buddhism ===
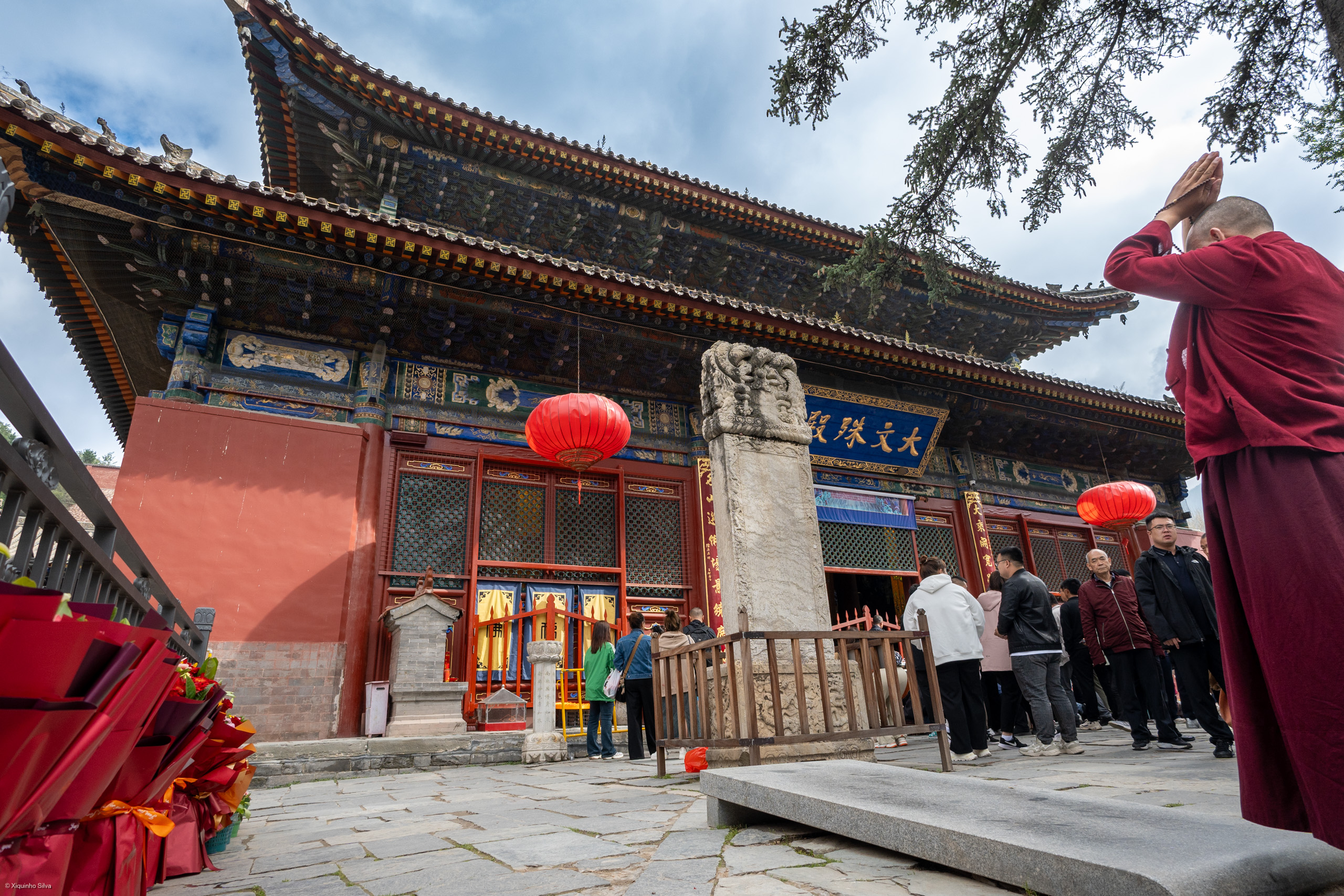
Buddhists praying at the Great Wenshu Hall of Mount Wutai, Shanxi

The Buddhist schools that emerged in the cultural sphere of Tibet (藏传佛教 Zàngchuán Fójiào or 喇嘛教 Lǎmajiào, "Lamaism") also have an influence throughout China that dates back to historical interactions of the Han Chinese with neighboring populations. Tibetan Buddhism and its clergy, the lamas, were introduced in China proper since the 7th century; its emphasis on ritual action was a shared element with Taoism. It spread significantly much later, with Tibetan influence in the west, and with the Mongols and Manchus in the north, especially under the dynasties which they established in China, the Yuan and the Qing dynasty.

Today, Tibetan Buddhism is the dominant religion in Tibet, among Tibetans in Qinghai and other provinces, and has a historical and significant presence in Inner Mongolia (where the religion's traditional name is Burkhany Shashin, "Buddha's religion", or Shira-in Shashin, the "Yellow religion"—黄教 Huángjiào in Chinese (Note: "Yellow religion", a synecdoche from the Yellow Hat sect, may also refer to yellow shamanism, a type of Mongolian shamanism which uses an expressive style inspired to Buddhism.)). However, there are many Tibetan Buddhist temples as far as northeast China, the Yonghe Temple in Beijing being an example.

There are controversies surrounding the Tibetan Buddhist hierarchy, specifically the succession of Tenzin Gyatso the 14th Dalai Lama—the spiritual leader of the Gelug school, the major school of Tibetan Buddhism—who, before fleeing China during the 1959 Tibetan uprising, had full political power in Tibet. The Panchen Lama, the Tibetan hierarch in charge of the designation of the future successor of the Dalai Lama, is a matter of controversy between the Chinese government and Tenzin Gyatso. The government of China asserts that the present (11th) incarnation of the Panchen Lama is Gyancain Norbu, while the 14th Dalai Lama asserted in 1995 that it was Gedhun Choekyi Nyima, who from that year has been detained by the Chinese government and never seen in public.

After the liberalisation of religions in China in the 1980s, there has been a growing movement of adoption of the Gelug sect, and other Tibetan-originated Buddhist schools, by the Han Chinese. This movement has been favored by the proselytism of Chinese-speaking Tibetan lamas throughout China.

=== Theravada Buddhism ===
Theravada Buddhism is a major form of Buddhism, practised mostly in Southeast Asia but also among some minority ethnic groups in southwest China, mainly in Yunnan. Theravada Buddhism spread from Myanmar to present-day Xishuangbanna, Dehong, Simao, Lincang, and Baoshan, all in Yunnan, during the 6th and 7th century. Today, this school of Buddhism is popular among the Dai people, and also the Palaung, Blang, Achang, and Jingpo ethnic groups.

The first Buddhist temple in Yunnan province, the Wabajie Temple in Xishuangbanna, was erected in 615. After the 12th century, Theravada Buddhist influence into the region began to come from Thailand. Thais began to bring copies of the Pali canon to Yunnan, to translate the scriptures and to build new temples. The people living in Yunnan where Theravada Buddhism is widespread follow norms similar to those of Thai Buddhists, and their Buddhism is often blended with local folk beliefs. Theravada Buddhism suffered from persecution during the Cultural Revolution, but after the 1980s it was revived.

=== Vajrayana Buddhism ===
Larung Gar Buddhist Academy in Sêrtar, Garzê, Sichuan. Founded in the 1980s, it is now the largest monastic institution in the world, with about 40,000 members of whom 1/10 are Han.

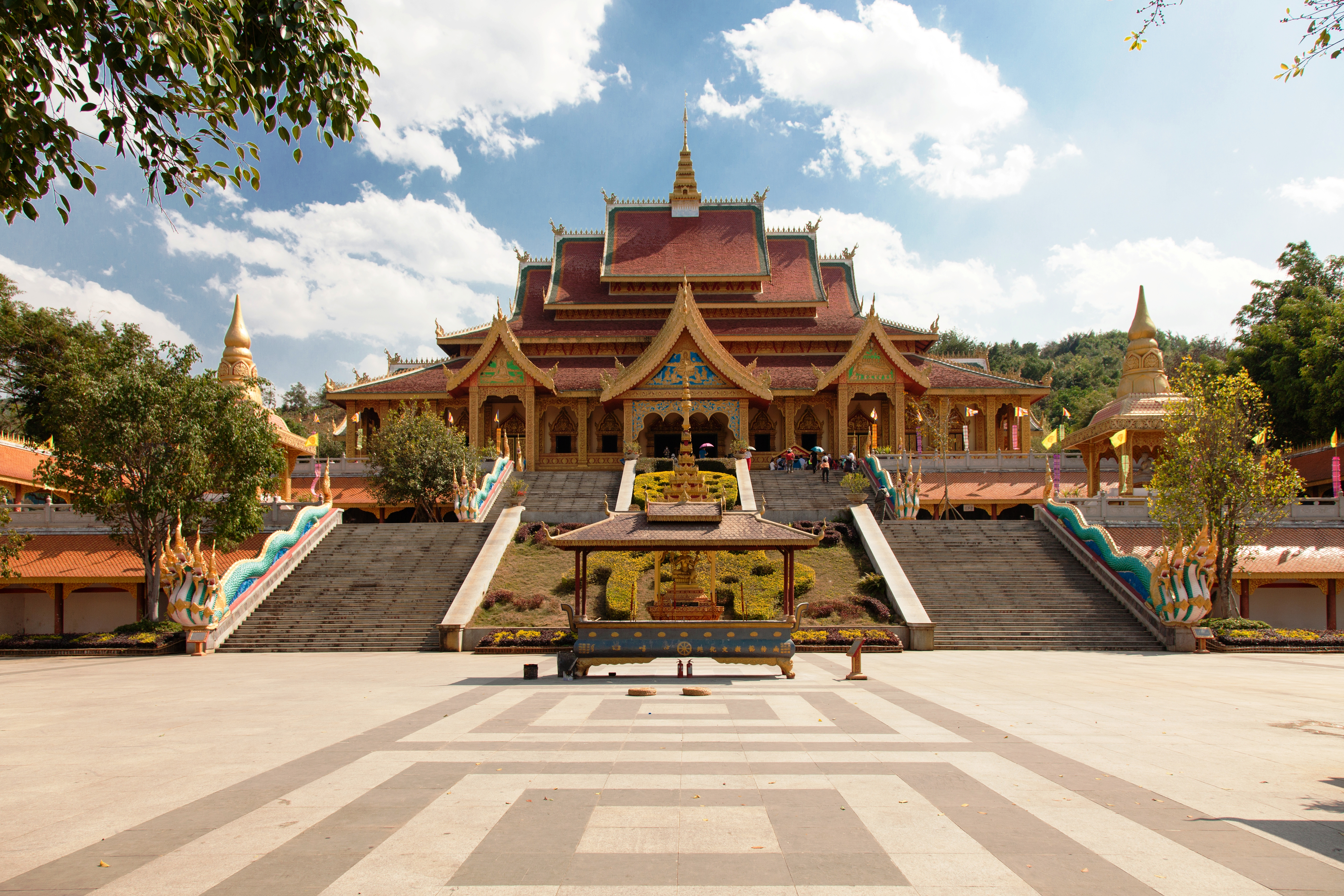
Mengle Temple, a Theravada temple in Jinghong, Xishuangbanna, Yunnan.

Besides Tibetan Buddhism and the Vajrayana streams found within Chinese Buddhism, Vajrayana Buddhism is practised in China in some other forms. For instance, Azhaliism (Chinese: 阿吒力教 Āzhālìjiào) is a Vajrayana Buddhist religion practised among the Bai people.

The Vajrayana current of Chinese Buddhism is known as Tangmi (唐密 "Tang Mysteries"), as it flourished in China during the Tang dynasty (618–907) just before the great suppression of Buddhism by imperial decision. Another name for this body of traditions is "Han Chinese Transmission of the Esoteric (or Mystery) Tradition" (汉传密宗 Hànchuán Mìzōng, where Mizong is the Chinese for Vajrayana). Tangmi, together with the broader religious tradition of Tantrism (in Chinese: 怛特罗 Dátèluō or 怛特罗密教 Dátèluó mìjiào; which may include Hindu forms of religion) has undergone a revitalisation since the 1980s together with the overall revival of Buddhism.

The Gateway of the Hidden Flower (华藏宗门 Huácáng Zōngmén) and the True Awakening Tradition (真佛宗 Zhēnfó Zōng) are two new Han Chinese movements within the Vajrayana, and are among the Buddhist sects which are officially proscribed as evil by the government.

=== Japanese Buddhism ===
==== Shin Buddhism ====
From the 1890s to the end of the Second Sino-Japanese War in 1945, the Hompa Honganji-ha organisation of the Jōdo Shinshū (淨土真宗; Chinese reading: Jìngtǔ Zhēnzōng, "True Tradition of the Pure Land"), or Shin Buddhism ("True Buddhism"), which is a Japanese variation of Pure Land Buddhism, carried out missionary activity throughout East Asia, including Manchuria, Taiwan and China proper. With the unconditional surrender of Japan at the end of the war, the missions were shut down.

Starting in the 1990s there has been a revival of Shin Buddhism among the Chinese, which has taken a formal nature with the foundation of the Hong Kong Fǎléi Niànfóhuì (香港法雷念佛会) in 2000, followed by the Fuzhou Fǎléi Niànfóhuì (福州法雷念佛会) founded in 2006 and the Shaanxi Fǎléi Niànfóhuì (陕西法雷念佛会) founded in 2010. There are Shin Buddhist groups also in Henan, Zhejiang, Inner Mongolia, Yunnan and other provinces.

The propagation of Shin Buddhism in China has faced some critiques for cultural, historical and doctrinal reasons. Cultural critiques point to the fact that Shin Buddhist clerics may marry and eat meat; modern Chinese Shin Buddhist groups, however, tend to follow the norms of celibacy and vegetarianism of Chinese Buddhism. Historical critiques have to do with the links that Jodo Shinshu had with Japanese militarism and colonialism prior to 1945. Doctrinal critiques are based on the attribution of "unfiliality" to Shin Buddhism, because it was not influenced by Chinese folk religion as Chinese Buddhism was, and therefore does not have firmly established practices for ancestor worship.

==== Nichiren Buddhism ====
Nichiren Buddhism, a denomination of the Buddhist religion that was founded in Japan in the 13th century, has been spreading in China in the 21st century in the form of the Soka Gakkai (in Chinese: 创价学会 Chuàngjià xuéhuì). Nichiren Buddhism was founded by the monk Nichiren (1222–1282), who elaborated his teachings upon the "Lotus Sutra" aspiring to reform Buddhism. Nichiren Buddhism promises both immediate relief from daily problems as well as this-worldly benefits. This society has engaged in missionary efforts in China partially aided by the good relationship it has interlaced with the Chinese government. Delegations from the Japanese Soka Gakkai and the Chinese government and intellectual class have made visits to each other, so that the society has been called an "intimate friend of the Chinese government". Soka Gakkai members in China are organized in the form of the house church, as they "meet quietly in small groups in the homes of other members", with little interference from the government.

== Demographics ==
As of 2023 studies, around 42 million people, or about 4% of China's total population, formally identify as Buddhist. A significant portion of those respondents also believe in figures such as Taoist immortals, Jesus Christ, Catholic God and Allah.

== See also ==
- Buddhist Association of China
- Buddhism in Hong Kong
- Buddhism in Taiwan
- East Asian Buddhism
- Four Buddhist Persecutions in China
- List of Buddhist architecture in China
- Religion in China
- Sacred Mountains of China
- Silk Road transmission of Buddhism
- Timeline of Buddhism
