= Four Buddhist Persecutions in China =

5th through 10th century suppressions

The Four Buddhist Persecutions in China (Chinese: 三武一宗法難) were the wholesale suppression of Buddhism carried out on four occasions from the 5th through the 10th century by four Chinese emperors: Emperor Taiwu of the Northern Wei dynasty, Emperor Wu of the Northern Zhou dynasty, Emperor Wuzong of the Tang dynasty, and Emperor Shizong of the Later Zhou dynasty. The first three events are collectively known as the Three Disasters of Wu (Chinese: 三武之禍; pinyin: sān wǔ zhī huò); they were named as such because the posthumous names or temple names of all three emperors who carried out the persecutions included the character Wu (武).

== First ==
The first Disaster of Wu started in 446, when Emperor Taiwu of Northern Wei, a devout Taoist who followed the Northern Celestial Masters, was fighting the Lushuihu rebel Ge Wu (蓋吳). During the campaign, weapons were located in Buddhist temples, and he therefore believed that Buddhists were against him. With encouragement from his also devoutly Taoist prime minister Cui Hao, Emperor Taiwu ordered Buddhism abolished under penalty of death, and slaughtered the Buddhists in the Guanzhong region, the center of Ge's rebellion. The ban against Buddhism was relaxed in Emperor Taiwu's later years, and formally ended after his grandson Emperor Wencheng of Northern Wei, a Buddhist, took the throne in 452.

== Second ==
In 567, former Buddhist priest Wei Yuansong (衛元嵩) submitted a memorial to the Emperor Wu (r. 561–578) of the Northern Zhou dynasty calling for the "abolition of Buddhism". In 574 and again in 577, Emperor Wu had Buddhist and Taoist images destroyed and their clergy returned to lay life. He believed the temples had become too rich and powerful, so he confiscated their land and gave it to his own soldiers. During this time, the Shaolin Monastery was closed but later reopened after the Emperor Xuan of Northern Zhou had the monastery renovated. Compared to the first Disaster of Wu, the second was relatively bloodless. When it officially ended was difficult to gauge, but it was probably over by the time that his son Emperor Xuan of Northern Zhou took the throne in 578.

== Third ==
In 845, Taoist Emperor Wuzong of the Tang dynasty initiated the "Great Anti-Buddhist Persecution" in an effort to appropriate war funds by stripping Buddhism of its financial wealth and to drive "foreign" influences from Tang China. Wuzong forced all Buddhist clergy into lay life or into hiding and confiscated their property. During this time, followers of Christianity, Judaism, Manichaeanism and Zoroastrianism were persecuted as well. The ban was not a complete ban; two Buddhist temples were permitted in both the main capital Chang'an and the subsidiary capital Luoyang, and the large municipalities and each circuit were each allowed to maintain one temple with no more than 20 monks. More than 4,600 temples were destroyed empirewide, and more than 260,000 monks and nuns were forced to return to civilian life. The persecution lasted for twenty months before Emperor Xuanzong ascended the throne and put forth a policy of tolerance in 846.

Several reasons led to the proscriptions, among them the accumulated wealth by the monasteries and the case that many people entered the Buddhist community to escape military service and tax duty, which lasted through the Song Dynasty. The increase in the number of temples and priests and nuns put financial pressure on the state, which prompted the successive dynasties to regulate Buddhism. A third reason was the rise of the Neo-Confucians who wrote manifests against the foreign religion, believing its monastic and egalitarian philosophies destroyed the social system of duty and rights of the upper and lower classes.

== Fourth ==
In 955, the Emperor Shizong (r. 954–959) of the Later Zhou dynasty (951–960), due to the need for copper, ordered that Buddha statues be destroyed so that copper could be used to mint coins. His edict was issued at the threat of death (if one illegally continued to possess more than five jin (斤) (roughly 2.5 kilograms) of copper; lesser weights brought lesser penalties), but it is unclear how many Buddhist monks, nuns, or lay persons were executed under the requirements of the edicts. Traditional historical accounts conflict on the issue of whether there was suppression of Buddhist doctrines or practice, although they, in unison, showed a lack of evidence of massacres. The Zizhi Tongjian and the New History of the Five Dynasties suggest the lack of suppression of doctrines and practices, although the New History indicated that people who had dependents were disallowed from becoming monks or nuns. The Old History of the Five Dynasties indicates that there were destructions of temples, and forced return to civilian life for monks and nuns whose vows were not approved of by their parents.

According to the Soka Gakkai Dictionary of Buddhism, Emperor Shizong destroyed 3,336 of China's 6,030 Buddhist temples.

== Regulation ==
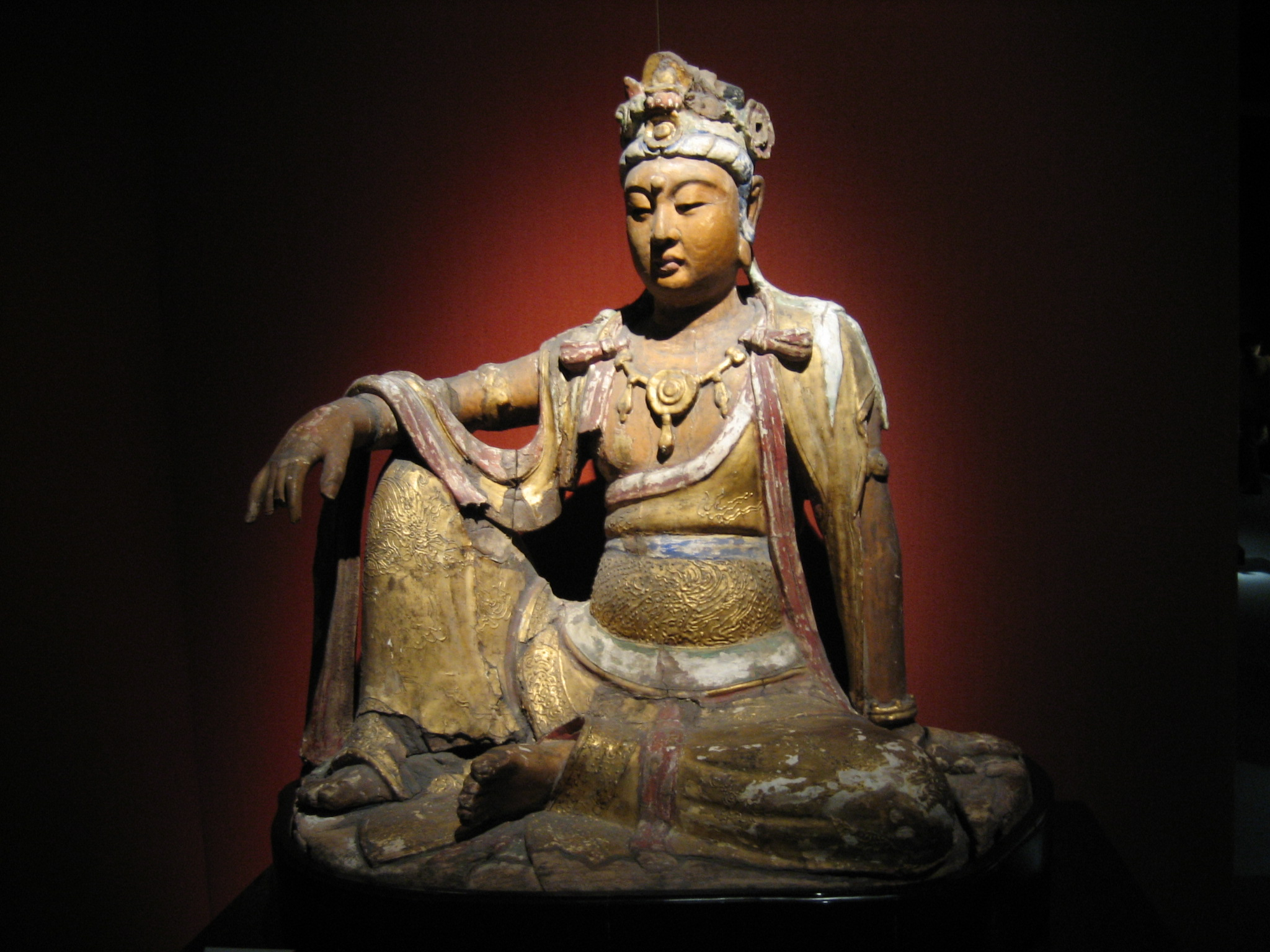
A wooden Bodhisattva from the Song Dynasty (960–1279 AD)

A report from the late 920s, on heretical Buddhist believers, comments that "sometimes Buddhist clergy and laity are ignorant and thoughtless. Men and women live together illicitly, forming themselves into groups, gathering at night and dispersing at dawn, speciously proclaiming and handing down a 'Buddhist law society' [fa-huai], clandestinely being loose in their morals." An edict in 1035 offered a substantial reward, thirty strings of cash, to anyone who was able to seize such sectaries or who informed on them leading to their capture. (Note that thirty strings of cash was the estimated cost to the state of supporting a postal worker for one year.) This report concerned the western circuits but people accused of similar practices could also be found in the east.

Constant wars drained China of money. This forced the court to raise taxes and to sell Buddhist "ordination certificates" (to prove a monk's tax, work, and military exempt status) in order to boost revenue. In 1067 these certificates became official policy. As a result, rich members of the lay community began to appropriate Buddhist temples in an attempt to build "cloisters" of tax exempt wealth. (But in 1109, an imperial decree stopped wealthy laymen from funding these temples and four years later in 1113 these temples lost their tax-exempt status. By 1129 it was estimated that 5,000 of these certificates were sold on an annual basis.) Some laymen even purchased their own ordination to avoid taxes. This way they would not have to pay money to the state, nor keep the Buddhist precepts since they were not real clergy. With an uneven balance of clergy and civilians, the state lost a major source of taxes and military personnel.

During the Prime-Ministry of "Reformer" Wang Anshi (1021–1086), the state began to take on social welfare functions previously provided by Buddhist monasteries, instituting public orphanages, hospitals, dispensaries, hospices, cemeteries, and reserve granaries.

== See also ==
- Buddhism
- Buddhism in China
- Chinese Buddhism
- Neo-Confucianism
- Taoism
- Antireligious campaigns in China
