= Zhen Luan =

Chinese mathematician (535-566)

Zhen Luan (甄鸾) (535 – 566) was a Chinese mathematician, astronomer, daoist and buddhist who was active during the Northern Zhou (557-581) of the Southern and Northern Dynasties period.

Born in the Wuji County of the present day Hubei Province, he is primarily known for the comments on the ancient mathematical treatises. Proceeding from them, he paid special attention to the "Nine Palaces" calculation technique; his description of the Luo shu represents an early example of textual comment on this scheme.

Zhen Luan developed the Tianhe calendar which was implemented in 566 and was current for the next 18 years.

Zhen trained in a Daoist congregation, but converted to Buddhism out of disgust with Daoist sexual practices. He wrote the anti-Daoist text Xiaodao Lun in 570 for Emperor Wu of Northern Zhou.

His solid scholarship was commended by Yan Yuan (1635 - 1704).

== Literature ==
- Schuyler Cammann, "The Magic Square of Three in Old Chinese Philosophy and Religion" in History of Religions, Vol. 1, No. 1 (Summer, 1961), pp. 37–80.
