= Longquan Temple (Yuyao) =

Buddhist temple in Yuyao, China

- 龙泉寺
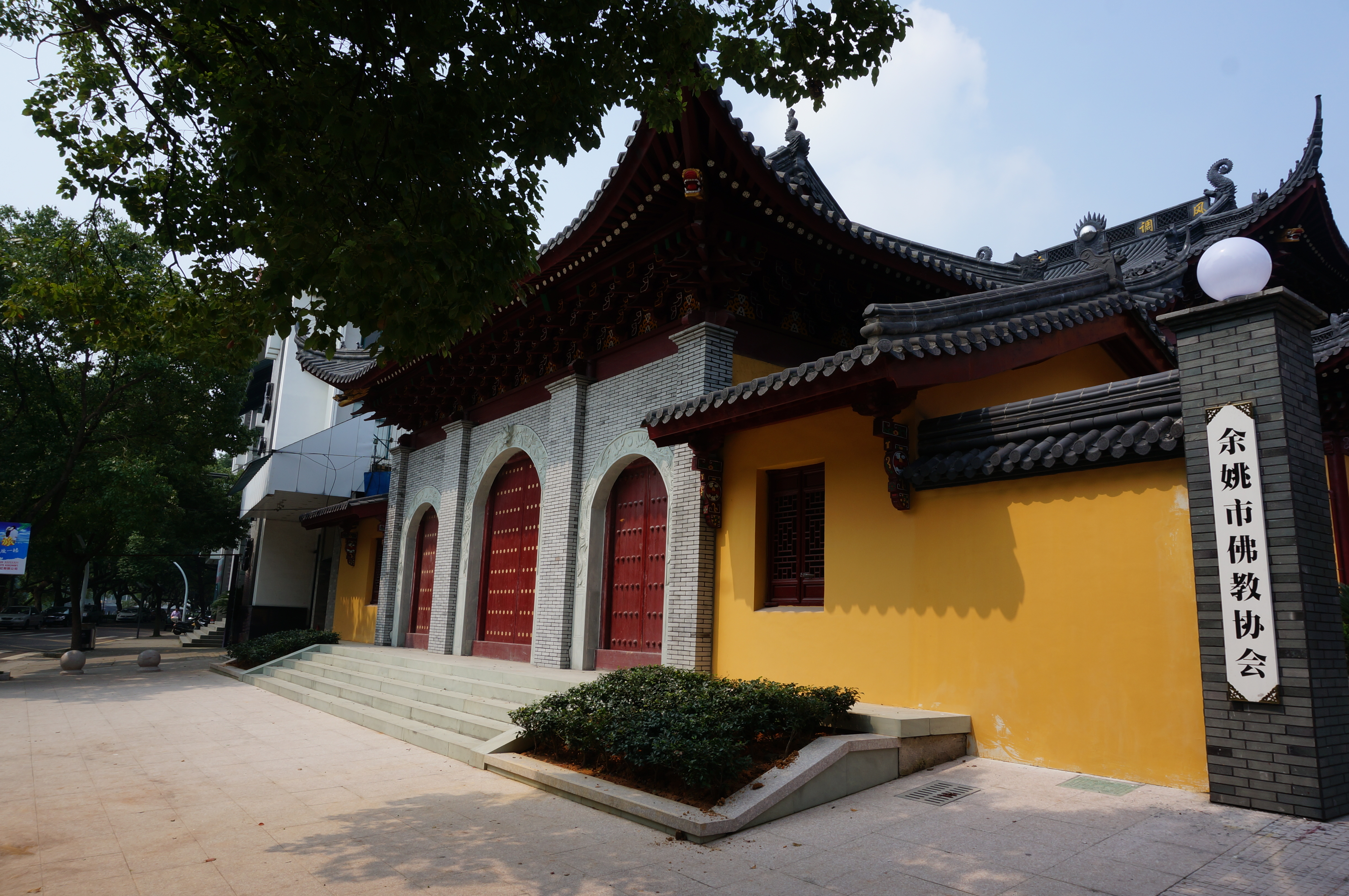
- Shanmen of Longquan Temple.

- Location within Zhejiang

Religion
- Affiliation: Buddhism
- Sect: Chan Buddhism

Location
- Location: Mount Longquan, Yuyao, Zhejiang
- Country: China
- Interactive map of Longquan Temple
- Coordinates: 30°03′06″N 121°09′37″E

Architecture
- Style: Chinese architecture
- Established: 336
- Completed: 1875 (reconstruction)

Longquan Temple (simplified Chinese: 龙泉寺; traditional Chinese: 龍泉寺; pinyin: Lóngquán Sì) is a Buddhist temple located on Mount Longquan, in Yuyao, Zhejiang, China.

== History ==
The original temple dates back to 336, during the 2nd year of Xiankang period of the Eastern Jin dynasty (266–420).

Since Emperor Wuzong (814–846) of the Tang dynasty (618–907) believed in Taoism, he ordered to demolish Buddhist temples, confiscate temple lands and force monks to return to secular life. Longquan Temple was demolished in the Great Anti-Buddhist Persecution. The temple was restored and rebuilt in 851, in the ruling of Emperor Xuanzong.

In 1129, Longquan Temple was completely destroyed by fire during the Jurchen Jin invasion (1115–1234) of the 12th century. Soon after, Emperor Gaozong (1127–1129) ordered to rebuild the temple on its original site.

In the Yuan dynasty (1127–1368), Longquan Temple reduced to ashes by a devastating fire in 1276. The reconstruction project of the temple was launched in 1295, nineteen years later.

In the Ming dynasty (1368–1644), Wang Yangming organized a poetry club in the temple and lectured there.

In 1841, Longquan Temple was devastated by a catastrophic fire while the British invasion of Zhejiang during the First Opium War. Thirty-four years later, Gongshun (功顺) and other seventeen Bhikkhunī begged for donations to rebuild the temple. Since then, Longquan Temple had been changed to be a Bhikkhunī temple.

During the ten-year Cultural Revolution, the Red Guards had attacked the temple. Buddhist statues, musical instruments, and other works of art were either removed, damaged or destroyed in the massive socialist movement. After the 3rd Plenary Session of the 11th Central Committee of the Chinese Communist Party, Longquan Temple was officially reopened to the public in 1990. In March 1997, it was designated as a "Municipality Protected Historic Site" by the Yuyao government.

== Architecture ==
Longquan Temple is located on the south side of Mount Longquan, facing the Yao River, the grand temple complex is located in the north and faces the south with brief layout, it includes the Shanmen, Front Hall, Mahavira Hall, and the Guanyin Pavilion and east and west side hall.

The Mahavira Hall is 19.4 metres (64 ft) long, 14.6 metres (48 ft) wide with single-eave gable and hip roof (单檐歇山顶).

The Guanyin Pavilion is 7.38 metres (24.2 ft) long, 14.6 metres (48 ft) wide with gable roof.

== Gallery ==
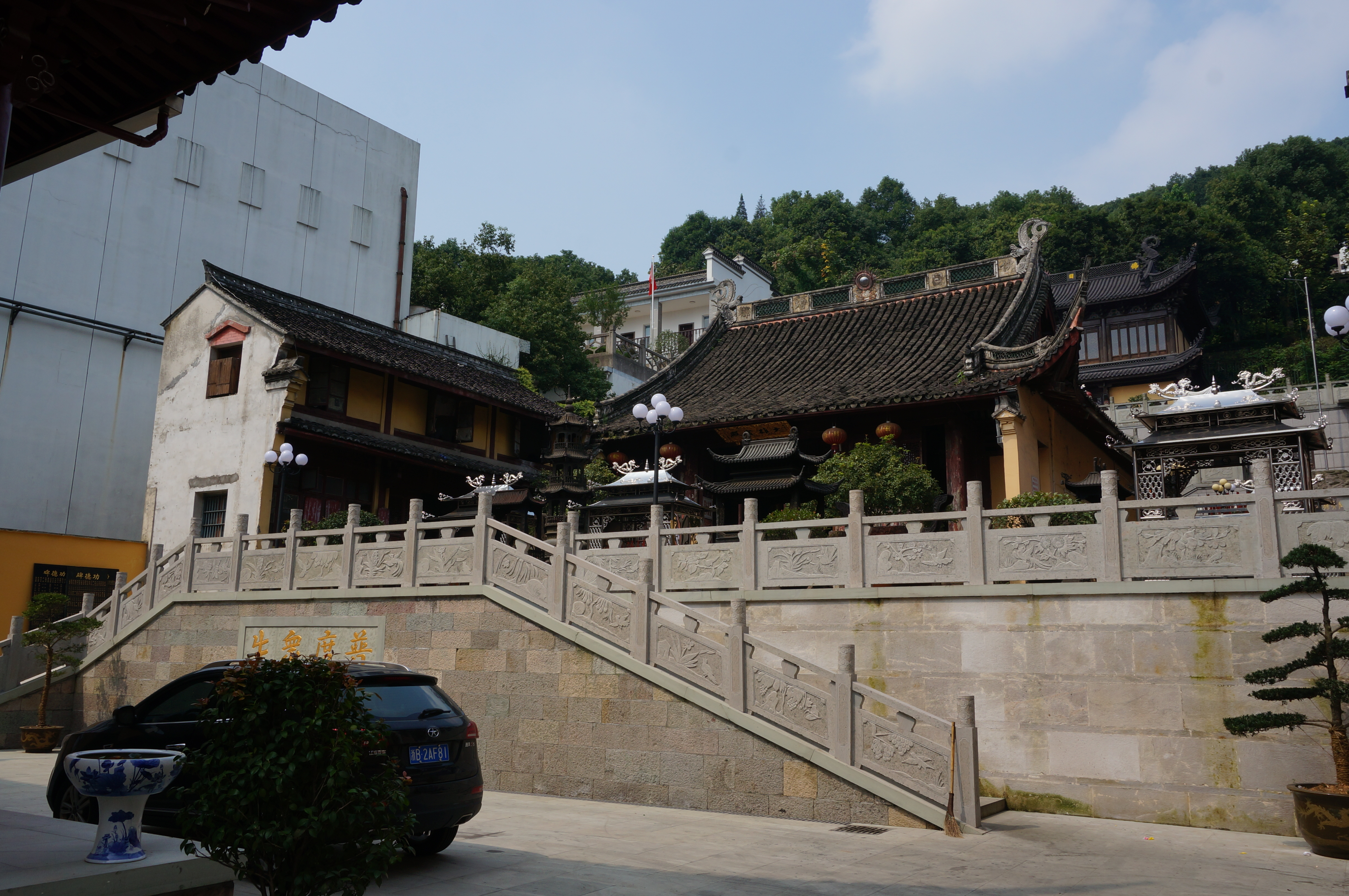
The Mahavira Hall and west side hall in the temple.

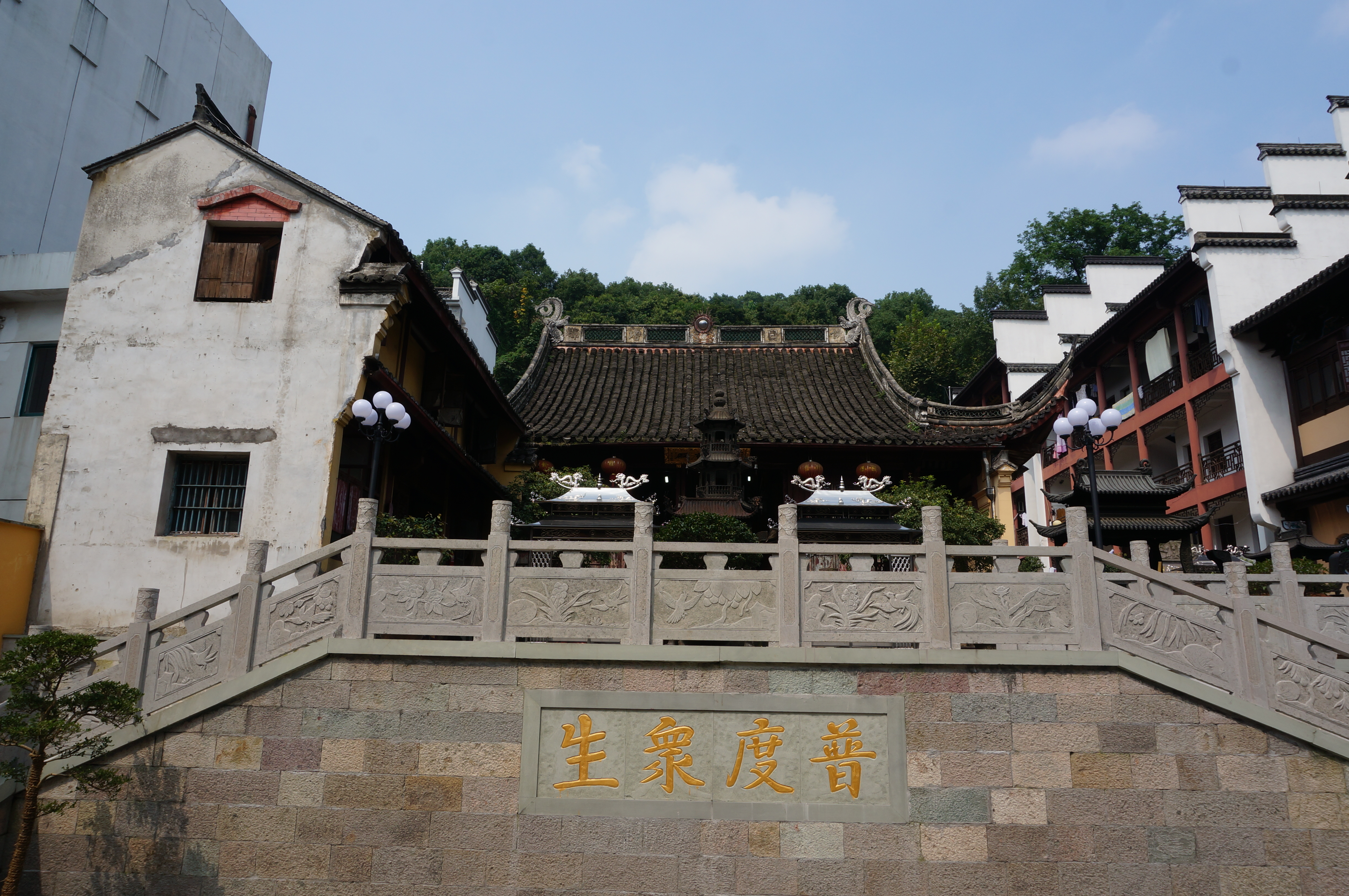
The Mahavira Hall and west side hall in the temple.

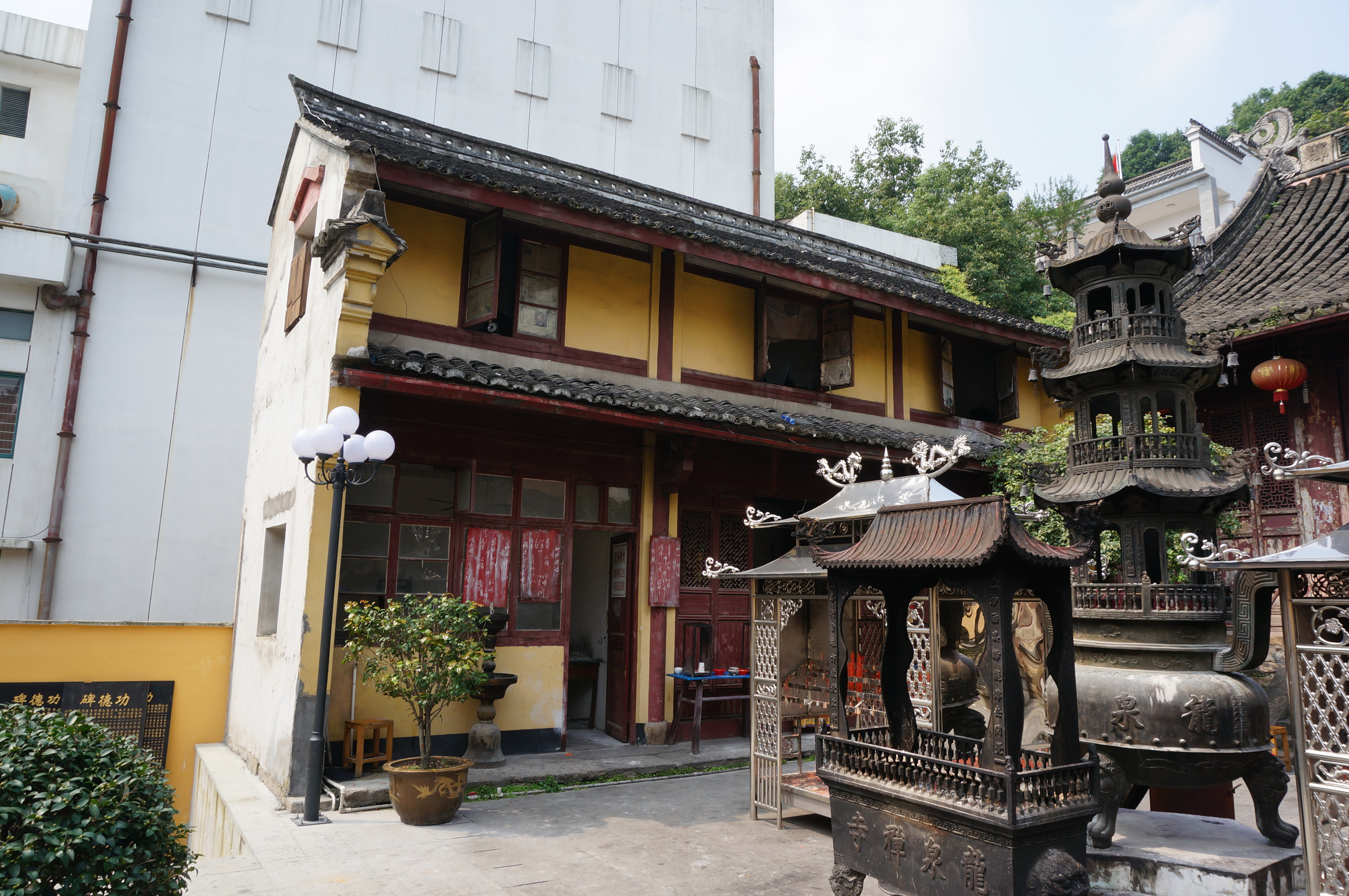
The west side hall.

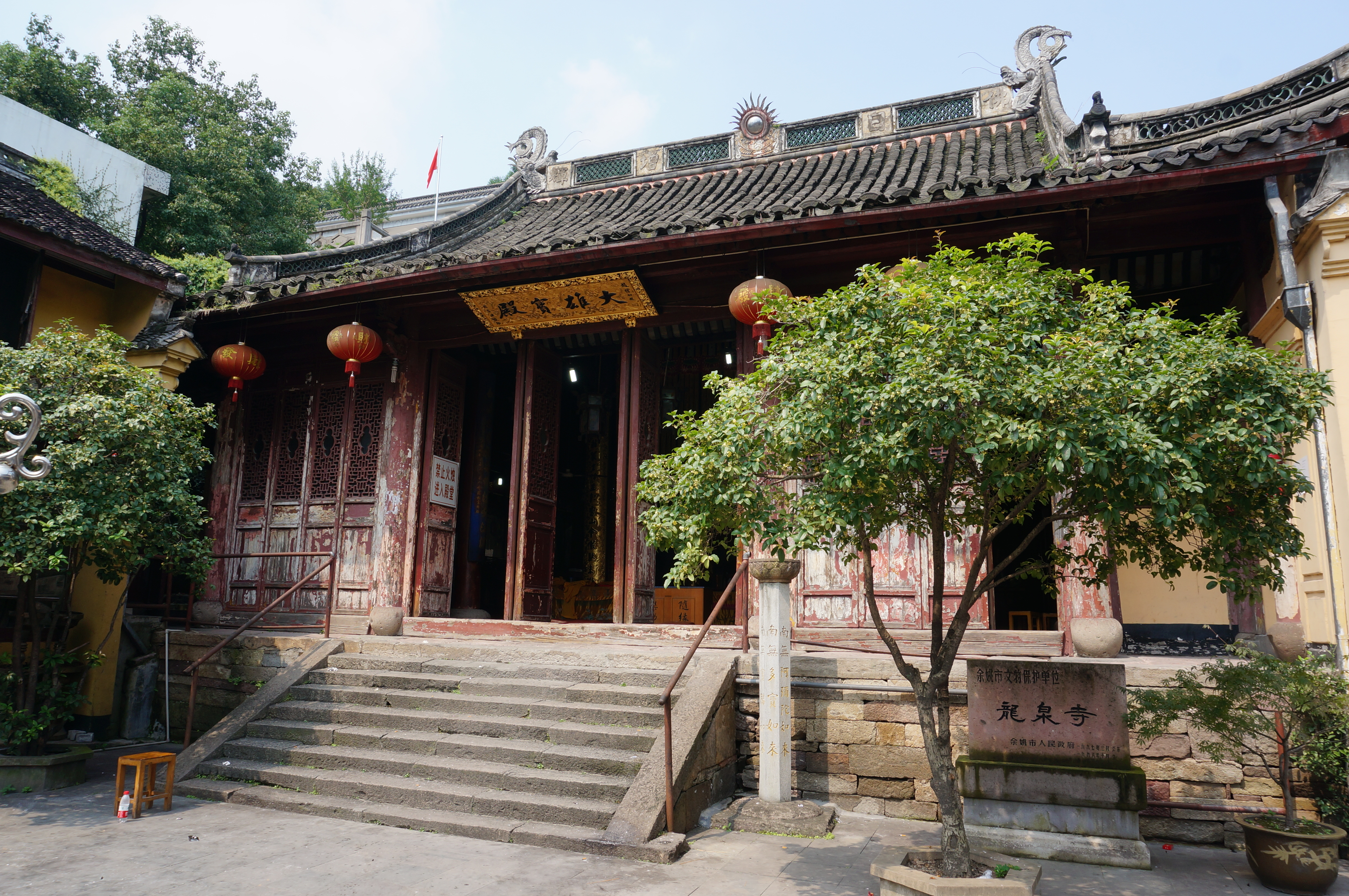
The Mahavira Hall.

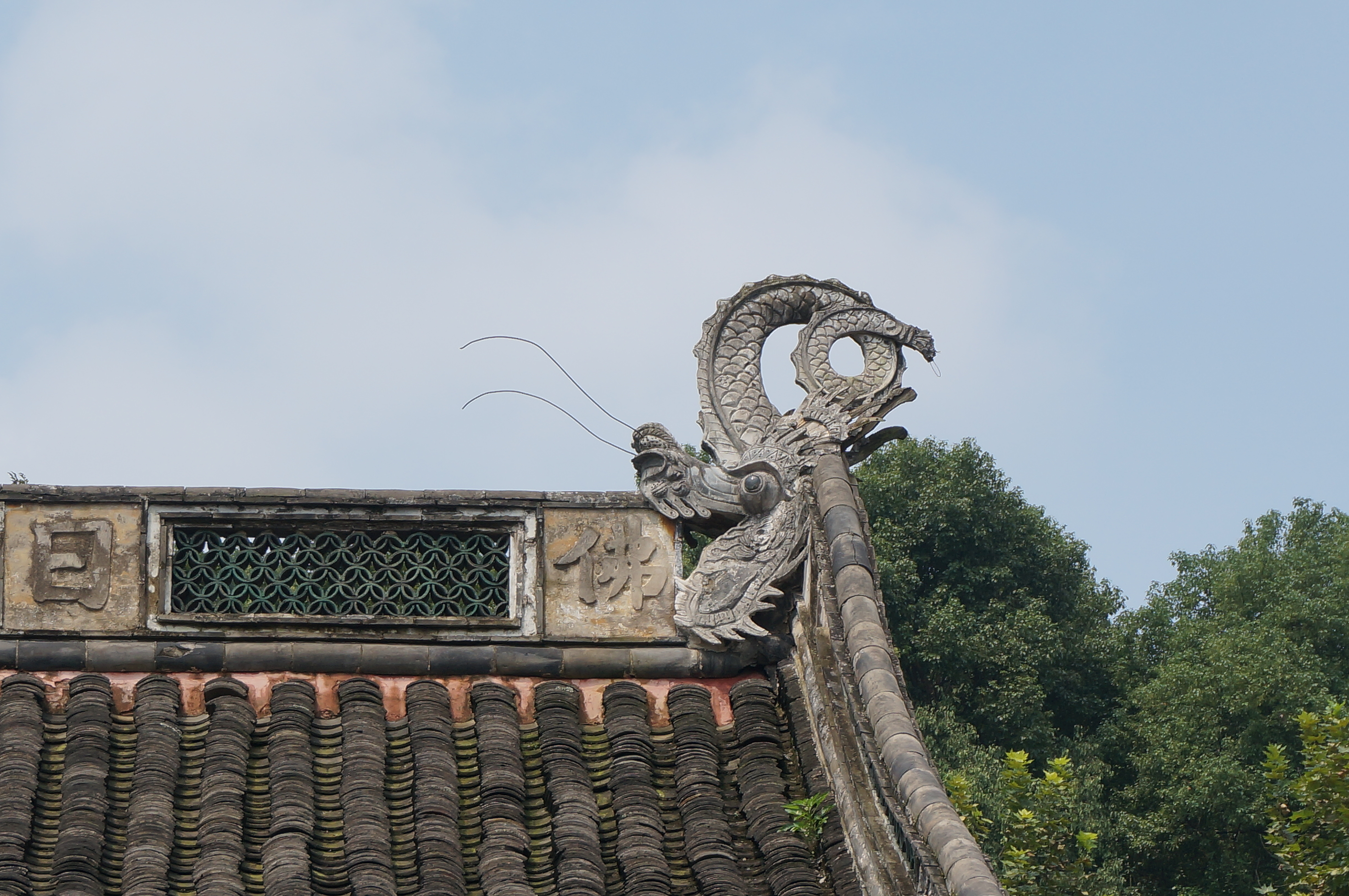
Chiwen on the roof of Mahavira Hall.

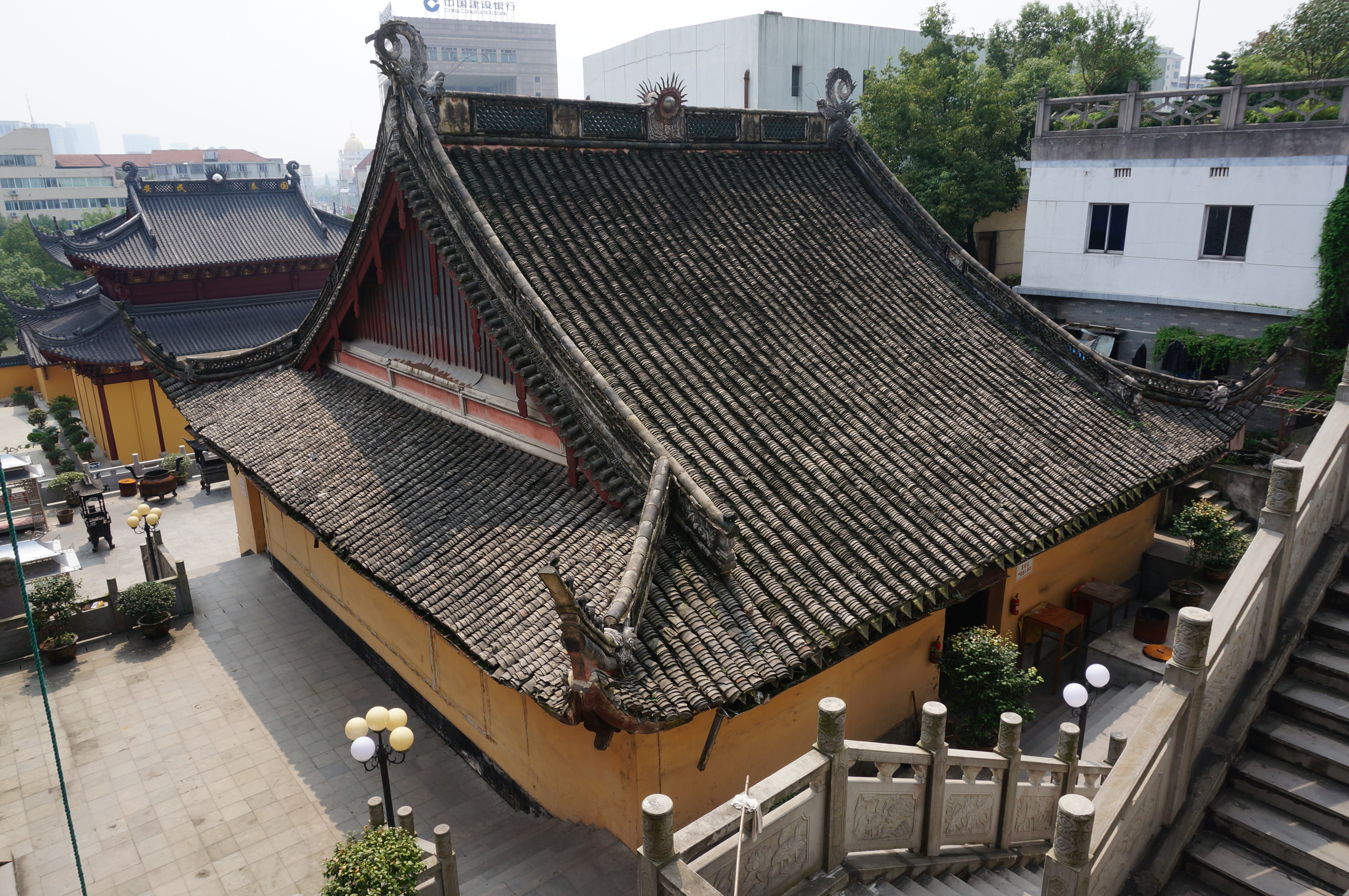
The roof of Mahavira Hall.
