= Wu Yun (Tang dynasty) =

Chinese writer and Taoist priest (died 778)

- 吳筠
- Born: Huayin, Tang China
- Died: 778; Xuancheng, Tang China
- Occupation: Poet

Wu Yun (Chinese: 吳筠; pinyin: Wú Yún; died 778) (Note: Courtesy name Zhenjie (Chinese: 貞節; pinyin: Zhēnjié). Also referred to as Wu Zongxuan (Chinese: 吳宗玄; pinyin: Wú Zōngxuán) in post-Tang literature.) was a Chinese poet, writer, and Taoist mystic active during the Tang dynasty. According to the two standard histories of the period, Wu served in Emperor Xuanzong's court as a member of the Hanlin Academy but left Chang'an shortly before the An Lushan rebellion broke out. According to Taoist scholar Louis Komjathy, Wu Yun "was probably the most famous Daoist poet in Chinese history."

== Sources ==
=== Old Book of Tang and New Book of Tang ===
Presenting a coherent biography of Wu Yun is not without its challenges. According to sinologist Jan De Meyer, "nearly all accounts of Wu Yun's life have contained a significant amount of inaccuracies." Moreover, there are numerous discrepancies between the two main accounts of Wu's life in juan 192 of the Old Book of Tang and juan 196 of the New Book of Tang. In the former source, which De Meyer assesses to be "so untrustworthy that it should better not be used at all", Wu is described as a "a Confucian scholar of the Lu region" (present-day Shandong). However, the latter states that Wu was a Huayin native who was born around 700.

Although both sources agree that Wu decided to become a full-time practitioner of Taoism after failing the jinshi examination at the age of fifteen, (Note: Jan De Meyer argues that the age of fifteen might have to be "understood symbolically", since fifteen is also the age in which "one sets one's mind to learning" according to the Analects.) the Old Book specifies that he settled down at Mount Song and was ordained by the eleventh patriarch of the Shangqing School, Pan Shizheng. On the other hand, the New Book gives Wu's new place of residence as Mount Yidi (倚帝山) near southern Henan. (Note: A "rather obscure" mountain also known as Mount Qiji (歧棘山), Mount Qili (騎立山), and Mount Wuduo (五朵山).)

The Old Book of Tang notes that Wu subsequently travelled to Jinling (present-day Nanjing), Mount Mao in Jiangsu (one of the most holy mountains according to the Shangqing School), and Mount Tiantai in Zhejiang sometime between 713 and 742. In contrast, the New Book of Tang claims that Wu only became ordained as a Taoist after his arrival in the capital city of Chang'an in 742 and that his journey to the south took place later still.

In any case, both sources acknowledge that Wu served as an official of the Hanlin Academy while in Chang'an and that he was good friends with the poet Li Bai, whom he had met when the latter was aged forty-two. (Note: Some modern scholars, however, have questioned if Wu and Li even knew each other in the first place. Jan De Meyer calls their supposed friendship a "persistent legend", while William H. Nienhauser Jr. concedes that it may be "anachronistic in the narrow historical sense".) Both sources also allege that Wu was unwilling to discuss "the cultivation of immortality" as well as his strident anti-Buddhist views with Emperor Xuanzong. Furthermore, both sources claim that Wu had foreseen the An Lushan rebellion, thus he requested to leave Chang'an before it broke out.

The Old Book gives Wu's place of death as somewhere near Zhejiang, but does not offer a time. Conversely, the New Book specifies that Wu died in 778, following which he was given the title of "Zongxuan xiangsheng" (宗玄先生). (Note: Translated into English as the "Elder Who Takes Mystery as His Ancestor", "Master of Ancestral Mystery" or "Master Who Honours the Mystery".)

=== Quan Deyu ===
Two biographies of Wu Yun have been attributed to Tang official Quan Deyu: the Wu zunshi zhuan (吳尊師傳) or Biography of Venerable Master Wu and the Zhongyue Zongxuan xiansheng Wu zunshi ji xu (中嶽宗玄先生吳尊師集序) or Preface to the Collected Works of Venerable Master Wu, the Master who Honours the Mystery, from the Central Marchmount. However, Jan De Meyer has argued that the former source is a forgery.

According to the Preface, Wu died in 778 in Xuancheng, Anhui. At the urging of disciple Shao Jixuan (邵冀玄), Wu's body was transported back to Mount Tianzhu for burial, apparently according to Wu's will.

=== Other biographical accounts ===
The Dongxiao tuzhi (洞霄圖志), a monograph on the sacred Mount Dadi (大滌山) compiled in 1305 by Deng Mu, refers to Wu more than a dozen times. According to Deng, Wu was summoned to Chang'an in 744, after which he became a disciple of Pan Shizheng at Mount Song. Sometime later, Wu and Li Bai were formally inducted into the Shangqing School by priest Gao Rugui (高入貴). Wu was also rumoured to have been "gifted with foreknowledge". Following his death in Xuancheng in 778, Wu's body was transported by his disciples back to Mount Tianzhu for burial and Wu was later conferred the posthumous title of Zongxuan xiansheng.

According to the thirteenth-century hagiographical collection Lishi zhenxian tidao tongjian (歷世真仙體道通鋻), Wu's departure from Chang'an was orchestrated by pro-Buddhist court eunuch Gao Lishi.

The lost Wu tianshi neizhuan (吳天師內傳) or Intimate Biography of Celestial Master Wu is attributed to a certain Xie Liangsi (谢良嗣) in a few late Tang and Song dynasty anthologies, but was more likely written by one of Wu's disciples, Xie Liangbi (谢良弼). An extract from the Biography—purportedly written by Wu himself—narrates Wu's flight from Chang'an to Mount Tai after the defeat of Wu Yuanji. This would have taken place several years after the poet's reported death, which implies that the account is either anachronistic or evidence of Wu Yun's immortality. In any case, the Biography goes on to state that Wu met Li Bai on Mount Tai and learnt from him the inner alchemic technique of "embryonic exhalation".

=== Posthumous references ===
Song dynasty gazetteer Fan Chengda observed that sometime in 778, two poems, "believed to have been written by a ghost", appeared on the wall of a Buddhist temple in Suzhou. One of the poems begins with the verse, "Shenxian bu ke xue" (神仙不可學) or "Spirit immortality cannot be studied"—an apparent repudiation of Wu's treatise Shenxian kexue lun (神仙可學論) or "Immortality Can Be Learned".

In one account dating to the mid-eleventh century, an official in charge of renovating a temple dedicated to the Taoist deity Xuanwu is visited in his dreams by Wu Yun, who reminds him to pay exactly twenty thousand cash.

In another account, collected in a Jin dynasty anthology of extraordinary tales, a pregnant woman meets Wu—whom she describes as "a man of solemn deportment, who had the looks of an immortal" in her dreams in 1133 or 1134. Her child, Dang Huaiying, grows up to become a respected academic and member of the Hanlin Academy.

Wu is depicted in the eighteenth chapter of the early Qing dynasty novel Sui Tang yanyi (隋唐演義) as a sima (司馬) or adjutant who successfully nominates Li Bai to become a court official.

== Works ==
A fifteenth-century collection of Wu's writings

At the time of Wu's death, some four hundred and fifty pieces of his writings were in circulation. Wu wrote at least ten essays, four of which are extant, including the Shenxian kexue lun (神仙可學論; "Immortality Can Be Learned"), the Xingshen kegu lun (形神可固論; "The Body Can Be Maintained"), the Xuangang lun (玄綱論; "The Mysterious Mainstays"), and the Xinmu lun (心目論; "On the Heart and Eyes").

The Xuangang lun, a wide-ranging treatise on issues such as "cosmology, the role of human nature and the emotions, the precedence of Daoism over Confucianism, and ... the attainment of immortality", was written during Wu's stay at Mount Song. It was presented to Emperor Xuanzong on 5 July 754. Xuanzong remarked that Wu was "well equipped to give far-reaching explanations to wise sayings, and to shed light on abstruse principles." Regarded by Wu's peers as his magnum opus, it was collected in numerous religious anthologies up to the Ming dynasty. Thirty-three chapters of the Xuangang lun survive.

None of Wu's six or seven essays on the problems with Buddhism have survived. During the Yuan dynasty in 1281, Kublai Khan ordered the destruction of all Taoist texts and printing blocks, with the exception of the Tao Te Ching. Among the texts singled out in Kublai's decree were three anti-Buddhist polemics by Wu: the Mingzhen bianwei lun (明真辨偽論; "Discourse on Illustrating the True and Disputing the False"), the Fuzheng chuxie lun (輔正除邪論; "Abolishing the Heterodox"), and the Shi xiao lun (十小論; "Ten Small Discourses").

Wu also composed numerous shi and fu, sometimes under the pseudonym of Dongyangzi (洞陽子) or "Master of Penetrating Yang". One hundred and thirty of his poems survive, alongside two stele inscriptions which were written in Wu's later years. The first inscription, dedicated to Lu Xiujing, was completed on 15 October 761 at Mount Lu. The second one, dedicated to the Taoist Tianzhu Guan (天柱觀) or Abbey of the Celestial Pillar, was likely written at Mount Dadi ten years later, although it is often dated to the first month of 778.
