= Wei Yuansong =

Chinese Buddhist monk

Wei Yuansong (simplified Chinese: 卫元嵩; traditional Chinese: 衛元嵩) was a former Buddhist monk who convinced Emperor Wu of Northern Zhou to abolish Buddhism. In 567, he submitted a memorial to the emperor stating that because Buddhist temples were against the interests of the nation, they should be abolished and Buddhist monastics return to a lay life. His memorial was greatly influenced Emperor Wu's decision to outlaw Buddhism in 574. Buddhist scriptures and images were destroyed and Buddhist priests and nuns were returned to lay life. This is counted as one of the Four Buddhist Persecutions in China.
