= Longquan Temple (Yunnan) =

Taoist temple in Panlong, Kunming

- 龙泉观
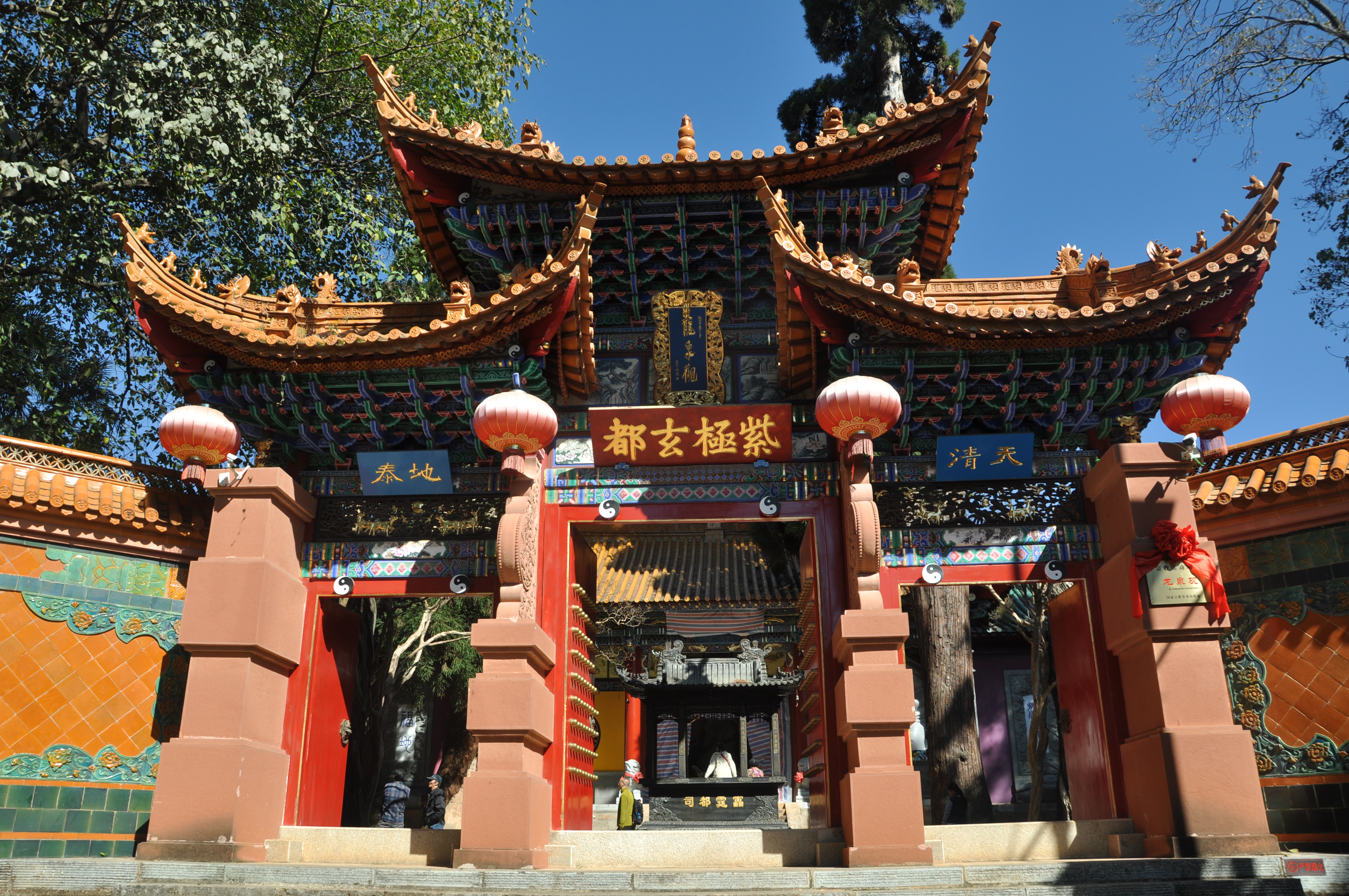
- The gate of Longquan Temple.

- Location within Yunnan

Religion
- Affiliation: Taoism

Location
- Location: Panlong District, Kunming, Yunnan
- Country: China
- Interactive map of Longquan Temple
- Coordinates: 25°08′41″N 102°45′15″E

Architecture
- Style: Chinese architecture
- Founder: Xu Rixian
- Established: Yuan dynasty
- Completed: 1394

Longquan Temple (simplified Chinese: 龙泉观; traditional Chinese: 龍泉觀; pinyin: Lóngquán Guàn) is a Taoist temple located in Panlong District, Kunming, Yunnan. The temple is renowned for its three ancient trees, namely the plum tree of Tang dynasty (618–907), cypress tree of the Song dynasty (960–1279) and tea of the Ming dynasty (1368–1644).

== History ==
The original temple dates back to the 14th century, during the Yuan dynasty (1271–1368). The modern temple was founded by Taoist priest Xu Rixian (Chinese: 徐日暹) in 1394, in the reign of Hongwu Emperor (1368–1398) of the Ming dynasty (1368–1644). During the Kangxi era (1662–1722) of the Qing dynasty (1644–1911), Fan Chengxun (Chinese: 范承勋), Wang Jiwen (Chinese: 王继文) and Xu Hongxun (Chinese: 许弘勋) renovated the temple. In the Guangxu period (1875–1908), Cen Yuying (Chinese: 岑毓英) and Du Ruilian (Chinese: 杜瑞联) redecorated the temple. In November 1993 it has been designated as a provincial level cultural heritage by the Yunnan Provincial Government.

== Architecture ==
Now the existing main buildings include the Gate, Hall of the Thunder God, Hall of the Jade Emperor, and Hall of the Three Pure Ones.

== Gallery ==
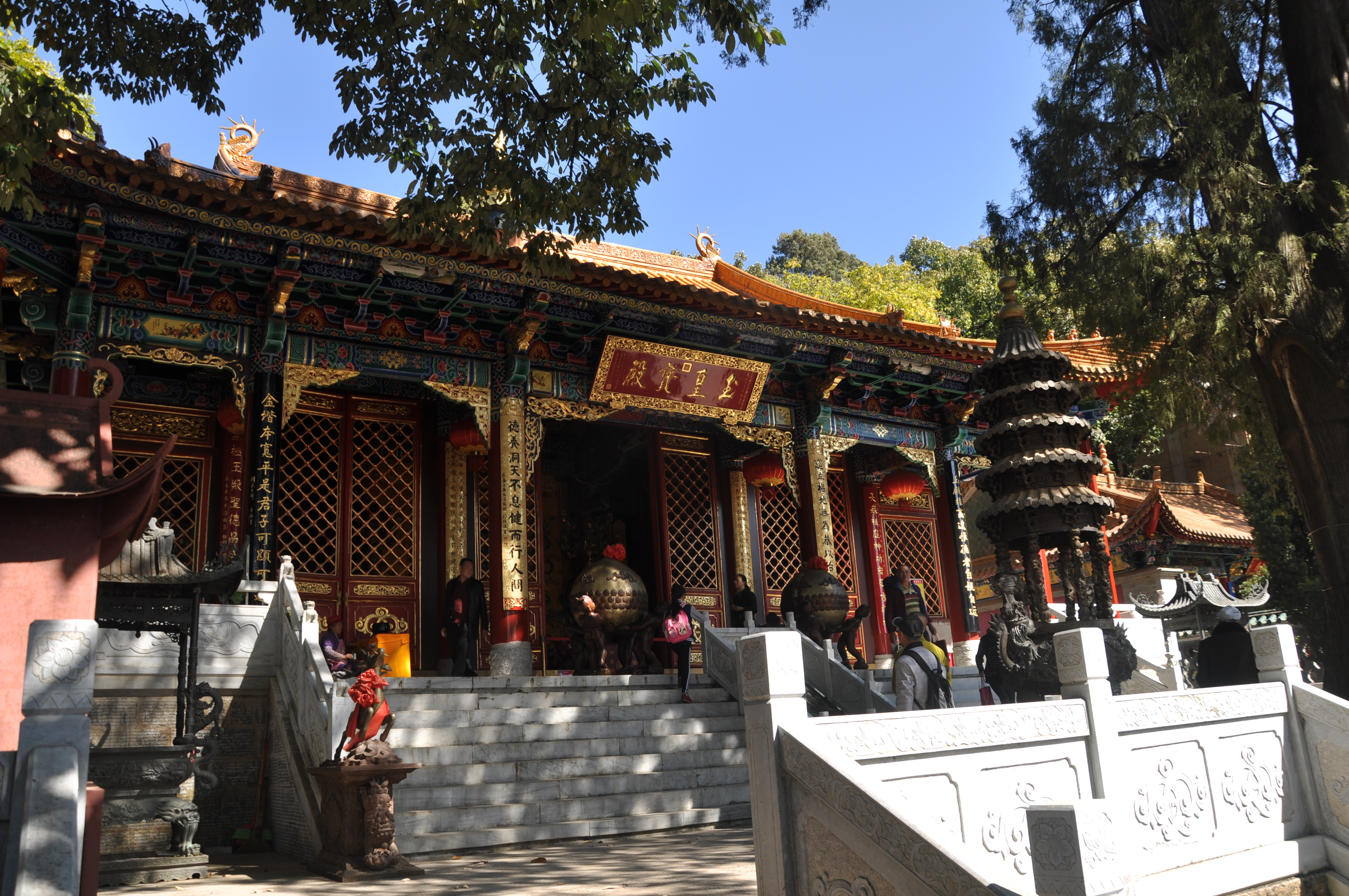
Hall of the Jade Emperor.

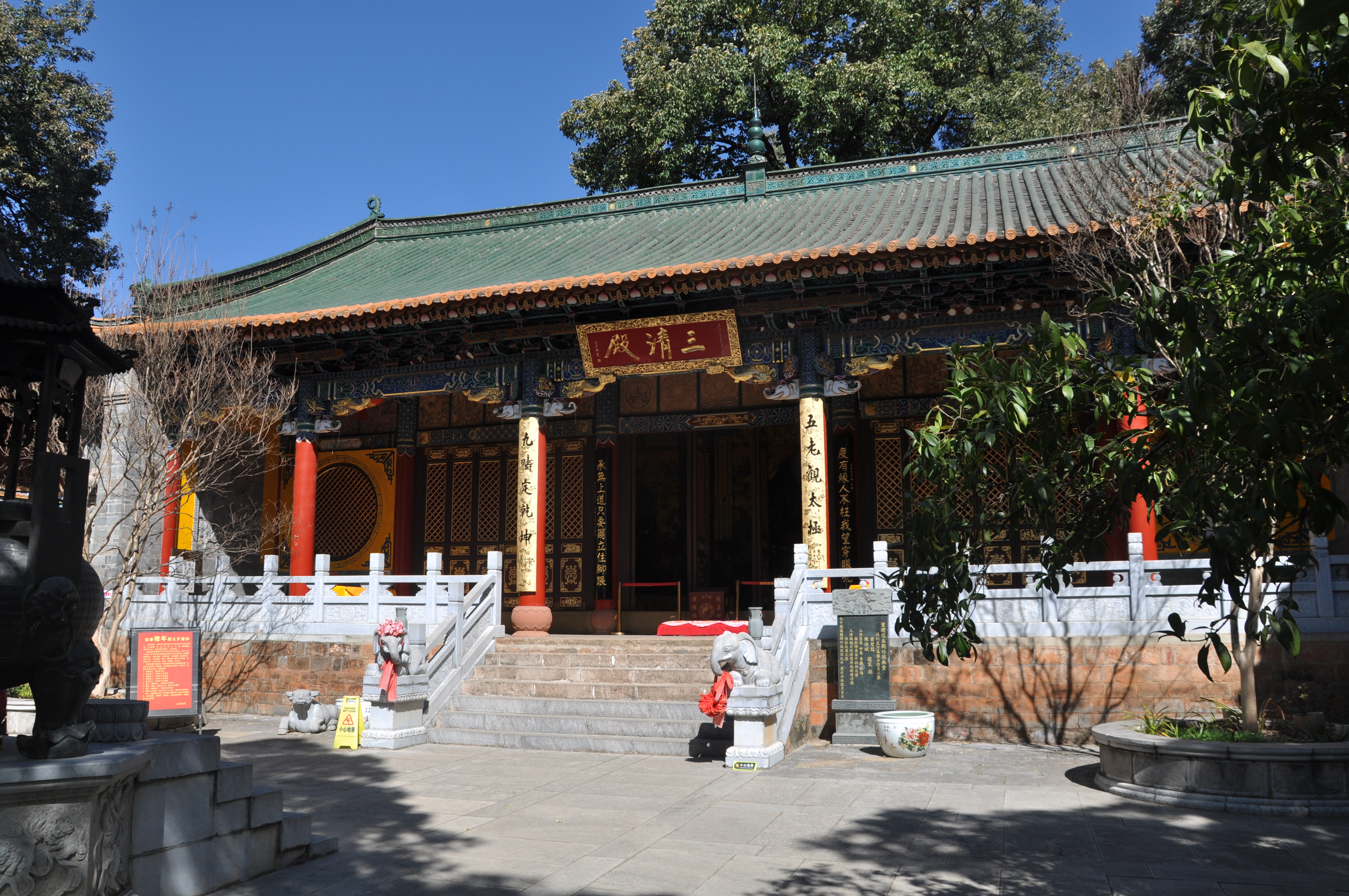
Hall of the Three Pure Ones.
