= Wanghe, Anhui =

Town in Anhui, China

Wanghe Town 王河镇
- Town
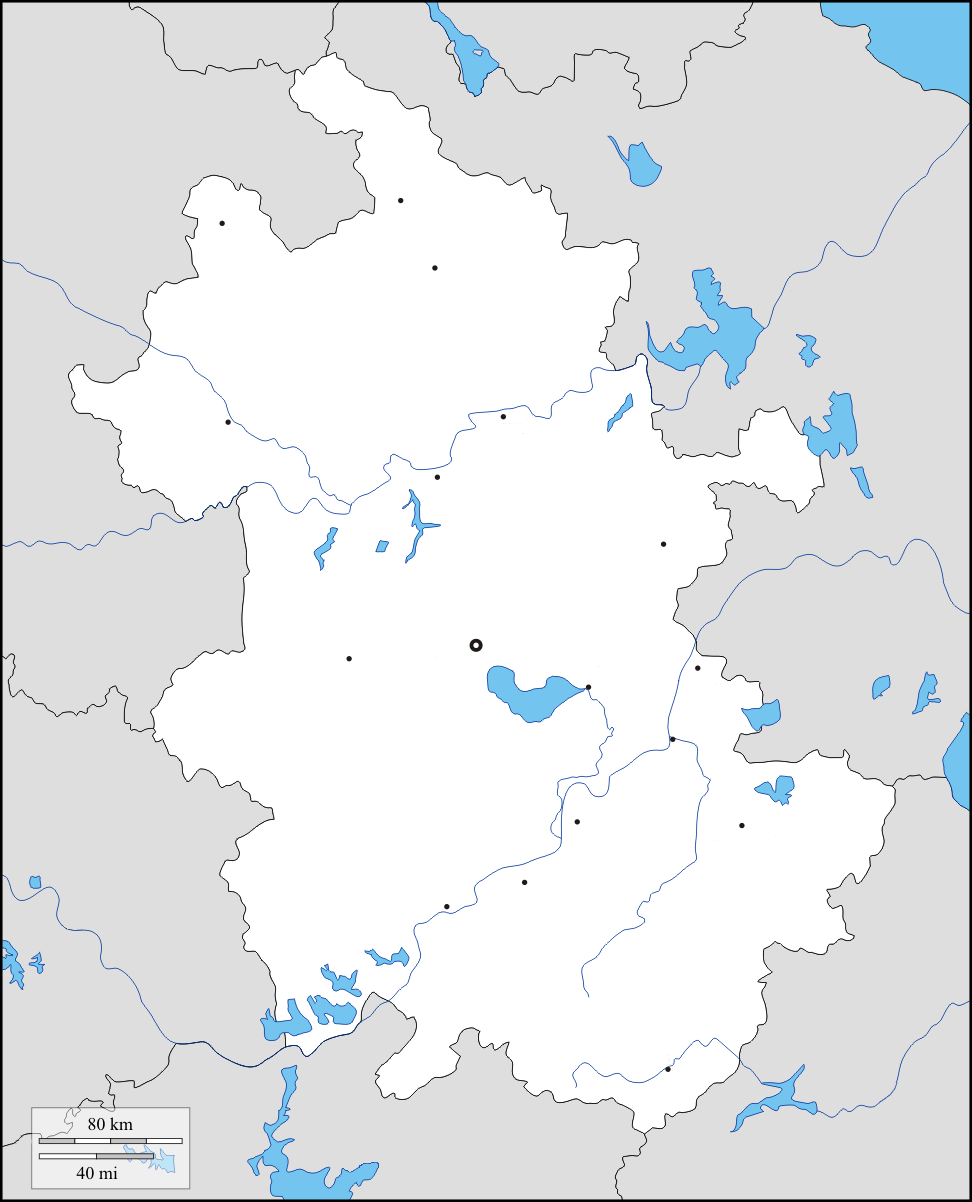
- Location in Anhui Wanghe Town (China)
- Coordinates: 30°30′44″N 116°34′47″E
- Country: China
- Province: Anhui
- Prefecture: Anqing
- County: Qianshan County
- Time zone: UTC+8 (China Standard Time)

Wanghe Town (Chinese: 王河; pinyin: Wánghé; lit. 'King's River') is a town in Qianshan County, southwestern Anhui province, Eastern China. The Qian River (潜江) flows through the town. Yonggang village is in the east of the town.

== Agriculture ==
On average the farmers of Wanghe own about 700 square metres (7,500 sq ft) of arable land each, growing mainly rice.

== See also ==
- List of township-level divisions of Anhui
