= Mount Tianzhu =

Mountain in Anhui, China

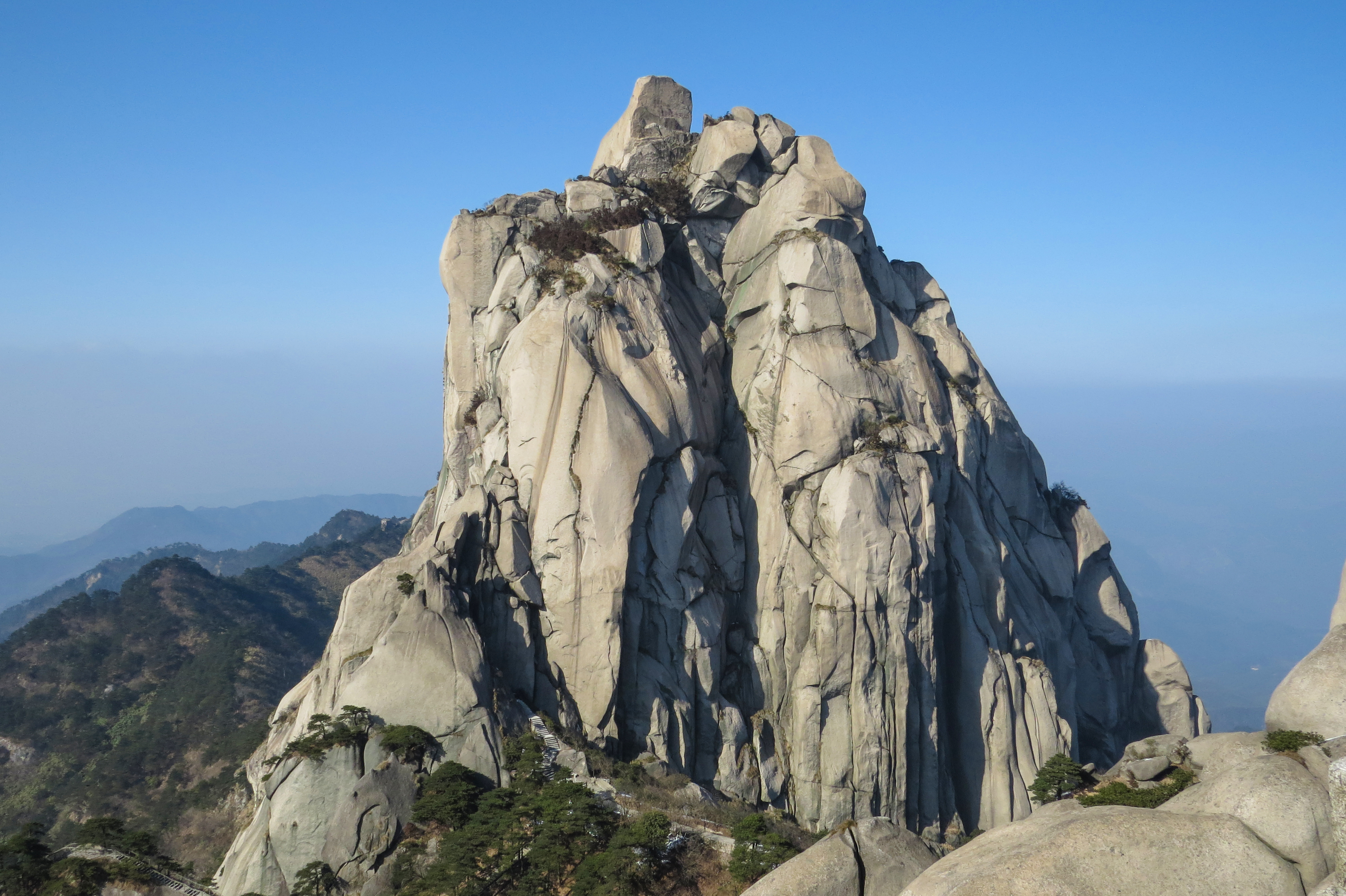
- Tianzhu Peak

Highest point
- Elevation: 1,760 m (5,770 ft)
- Prominence: 1,642 m (5,387 ft)
- Listing: Ultra
- Coordinates: 31°03′42″N 116°11′15″E

Geography
- Location within China
- Location: Anhui, China
- Parent range: Shangdong Ranges

Tianzhu Mountain or Mount Tianzhu (Chinese: 天柱山; pinyin: Tiānzhù Shān; lit. 'Heaven pillar mount') is a mountain in Anhui, China. Tianzhu Mountain is also called Mount Wan (Chinese: 皖山; pinyin: Wǎn Shān), from which the provincial abbreviation for Anhui (Wan) derives. Ancient names of the mountain include Mount Huo (霍山), Mount Heng (衡山) (not to be confused with Mount Heng in Hunan Province), and Taiyue (太岳).

The mountain is located in Qianshan County, Anqing. Tianzhu Mountain has 45 peaks over 1000 meters above sea level. Its highest point has an elevation of 1,760 meters (5,774 ft). There are two paths to reach the top, from the east and from the west; the western path is the easier one.

== Sights ==
The mountain area includes secluded caves and canyons.

One of the most famous sites is the Mystery Valley (Chinese: 神秘谷; pinyin: Shénmì Gǔ). It is a maze-like valley formed by the rocks falling from the mountain. The valley has 53 caves, which form a very complicated maze.

Subsequently certified as a National Geopark, and then as a regional geopark (Asia Pacific Geopark Network), it was admitted as a UNESCO Global Geopark in 2011.

== Climate ==
Climate data for Mount Tianzhu, elevation 968 m (3,176 ft), (1991–2020 normals)
| Month | Jan | Feb | Mar | Apr | May | Jun | Jul | Aug | Sep | Oct | Nov | Dec | Year |
|---|---|---|---|---|---|---|---|---|---|---|---|---|---|
| Mean daily maximum °C (°F) | 3.9 (39.0) | 6.6 (43.9) | 11.9 (53.4) | 17.4 (63.3) | 21.7 (71.1) | 23.6 (74.5) | 26.2 (79.2) | 26.5 (79.7) | 22.7 (72.9) | 18.0 (64.4) | 12.7 (54.9) | 6.6 (43.9) | 16.5 (61.7) |
| Daily mean °C (°F) | 0.3 (32.5) | 2.7 (36.9) | 7.5 (45.5) | 12.8 (55.0) | 17.4 (63.3) | 20.1 (68.2) | 22.8 (73.0) | 22.7 (72.9) | 18.8 (65.8) | 13.8 (56.8) | 8.5 (47.3) | 2.5 (36.5) | 12.5 (54.5) |
| Mean daily minimum °C (°F) | −2.6 (27.3) | −0.4 (31.3) | 3.9 (39.0) | 9.0 (48.2) | 13.8 (56.8) | 17.2 (63.0) | 20.5 (68.9) | 20.1 (68.2) | 15.9 (60.6) | 10.5 (50.9) | 5 (41) | −0.7 (30.7) | 9.4 (48.8) |
| Average precipitation mm (inches) | 62.3 (2.45) | 89.4 (3.52) | 125.2 (4.93) | 163.6 (6.44) | 238.0 (9.37) | 315.8 (12.43) | 370.9 (14.60) | 225.6 (8.88) | 123.0 (4.84) | 79.5 (3.13) | 65.6 (2.58) | 45.9 (1.81) | 1,904.8 (74.98) |
| Average precipitation days (≥ 0.1 mm) | 12.3 | 13.2 | 14.0 | 13.5 | 14.3 | 16.0 | 16.2 | 15.1 | 11.6 | 11.0 | 11.5 | 9.1 | 157.8 |
| Average snowy days | 8.3 | 4.8 | 3.4 | 0.3 | 0 | 0 | 0 | 0 | 0 | 0 | 1.1 | 4.2 | 22.1 |
| Average relative humidity (%) | 72 | 76 | 73 | 72 | 76 | 87 | 90 | 88 | 83 | 74 | 71 | 65 | 77 |
| Mean monthly sunshine hours | 104.7 | 100.0 | 131.4 | 148.6 | 146.6 | 94.5 | 113.1 | 139.2 | 120.8 | 149.7 | 142.2 | 137.8 | 1,528.6 |
| Percentage possible sunshine | 33 | 32 | 35 | 38 | 34 | 22 | 26 | 34 | 33 | 43 | 45 | 44 | 35 |
Source: China Meteorological Administration

== See also ==
- Sanzu Temple
- List of ultras of Tibet, East Asia and neighbouring areas
