= Huichang persecution of Buddhism =

Period of suppression of foreign religions within Tang China from 840 to 845 AD

- Traditional Chinese: 會昌毀佛
- Simplified Chinese: 会昌毁佛
Transcriptions
Standard Mandarin
- Hanyu Pinyin: Huìchāng huǐ fó

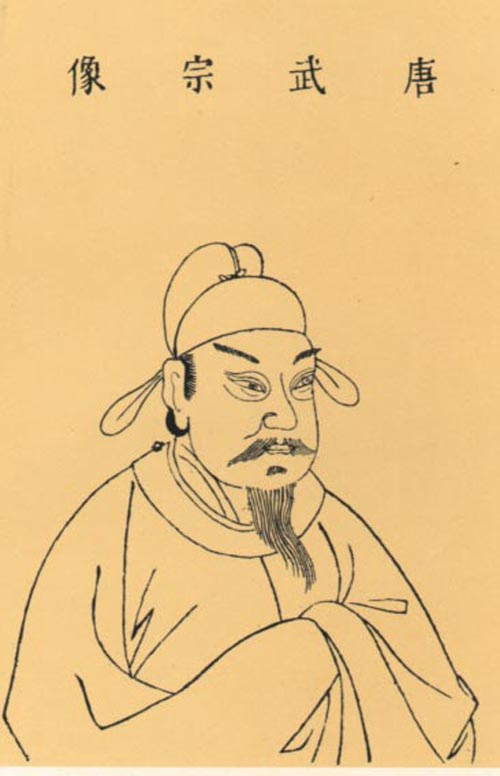
Emperor Wuzong of Tang, reigned 840–846.

The Huichang Persecution of Buddhism (Chinese: 会昌毁佛) was initiated by Emperor Wuzong (Li Chan) of the Tang dynasty during the Huichang era (841–845). Among its purposes was to appropriate war funds and to cleanse Tang China of foreign influences. As such, the persecution was directed not only towards Buddhism but also towards other religions, such as Zoroastrianism, Nestorian Christianity, and Manicheism.

== Rationale ==
Emperor Wuzong's economic, social, and religious reasons for persecuting Buddhist organizations and temples throughout China were as follows:

- Economic reasons: In 843, the emperor's armies won a decisive battle against the Uyghur tribes at the cost of almost bankrupting the country. Wuzong's solution to the financial crisis was to go after the wealth that had been accumulated in the Buddhist monasteries. Buddhism had flourished greatly during the Tang period, and its monasteries enjoyed tax-exempt status. In 845, Wuzong closed many Buddhist shrines, confiscated their property, and sent the monks and nuns home to lay life.
- Social reasons: Confucian intellectuals such as Han Yu railed against Buddhism for undermining the social structure of China. They claimed it eroded the loyalty of son to father, and subject to ruler, by encouraging people to leave their families and to become monks and nuns. Once they had been ordained, they stopped engaging in economic activity such as agriculture and weaving, and lived from the support of others. The persecution sought to return monks and nuns to the ranks of tax-paying commoners engaged in what was perceived to be more useful economic activity. Additionally, monastic money-lending, pawnbroking, and employment of slave labor were seen as inherently exploitative of the poor, with a decree in 713 stating, "it is claimed that the purpose of this generosity is to relieve the poor and orphans. But in fact, there is nothing to it but excess and fraud. This is not a legitimate business."
- Religious reasons: While Wuzong saw Buddhism as a foreign religion that was harmful to Chinese society, he became a zealous follower of Taoism, a faith native to China. Buddhism preached the attainment of non-birth or Nirvana, which its critics equated with death, while Taoism promised immortality, a notion that increasingly captured the attention of the emperor as he grew older.

An imperial edict of 845 stated the case against Buddhism as follows:

Buddhist monasteries daily grew higher. Men's strength was used up in work with plaster and wood. Men's gain was taken up in ornaments of gold and precious stones. Imperial and family relationships were forsaken for obedience to the fees of the priests. The marital relationship was opposed by the ascetic restraints. Destructive of law, injurious to mankind, nothing is worse than this way. Moreover, if one man does not plow, others feel hunger; if one woman does not tend the silkworms, others go cold. Now, in the Empire, there are monks and nuns innumerable. All depend on others to plow that they may eat, on others to raise silk that they may be clad. Monasteries and refuges (homes of ascetics) are beyond compute.

Beautifully ornamented; they take for themselves palaces as a dwelling.... We will repress this long-standing pestilence to its roots ... In all the Empire, more than four-thousand six-hundred monasteries are destroyed, two-hundred and sixty-thousand five-hundred monks and nuns are returning to the world, both (men and women) to be received as taxpaying householders. Refuges and hermitages which are destroyed number more than forty-thousand. We are resuming fertile land of the first grade, several tens of millions of Ch'ing (1 ching is 15.13 acres). We are receiving back as tax paying householders, male and female, one hundred and fifty thousand serfs. The aliens who hold jurisdiction over the monks and nuns show clearly that this is a foreign religion.

Ta Ch'in (Syrian Christian) and Muh-hu-fo (Zoroastrian) monks to the number of more than three-thousand are compelled to return to the world, lest they confuse the customs of China. With simplified and regulated government, we will achieve a unification of our manners, that in future, all our youth may together return to the royal culture. We are now beginning this reformation; how long it will take we do not know.

== Events of the persecution ==
The first phase of the persecution was aimed at purifying or reforming the Buddhist establishment, rather than putting an end to it. Thus, the persecution began in 842 with an imperial edict declaring that undesirables such as sorcerers or convicts be separated out from the ranks of the Buddhist monks and nuns, and returned to lay life. In addition, monks and nuns were to turn their wealth over to the government; those who wished to keep their wealth would be returned to lay life and forced to pay taxes. During this first phase, Confucian arguments for the reform of Buddhist institutions and the protection of society from Buddhist influence and practices were predominant.

Gradually, however, the Emperor Wuzong became more and more impressed with the claims of some Taoists, and came to develop a severe dislike for Buddhism. The Japanese monk Ennin, who lived in China during the persecution, even suggested that the emperor had been influenced by his illicit love of a beautiful Taoist princess. As time went on, the emperor became more irascible and erratic in his judgments. One of his edicts banned the use of single-wheeled wheelbarrows, as they break up "the middle of the road," an important concept of Taoism.

In 844, the persecution moved into a second phase, aimed at removing Buddhism altogether, rather than the reformation of Buddhism. According to a report prepared by the Board of Worship, at the time there were 4,600 monasteries, 40,000 hermitages, and 260,500 monks and nuns. The emperor issued edicts that Buddhist temples and shrines be destroyed, that all monks (desirables as well as undesirables) be defrocked, that the properties of the monasteries be confiscated, and that Buddhist paraphernalia be destroyed. By the edict of AD 845, all of the monasteries were abolished, with very few exceptions, with all images of bronze, silver, or gold handed over to the government.

In 846, the Emperor Wuzong died, perhaps on account of the elixirs of life he had been consuming (although it is also possible that he was intentionally poisoned). Shortly after his death, his successor proclaimed a general amnesty, ending the persecution.

== Persecution of other religions ==
In addition to Buddhism, Wuzong persecuted other foreign religions as well. He all but destroyed Zoroastrianism and Manicheism in China, and his persecution of the growing Nestorian Christian churches sent Chinese Christianity into a decline, from which it did not recover until the establishment of the Yuan dynasty.

It most likely led to the disappearance of Zoroastrianism in China.

Chinese records state Zoroastrianism and Christianity were regarded as heretical forms of Buddhism, and were included within the scope of the edicts. Below is from an edict concerning the two religions:

As for the Tai-Ch'in (Syrian) and Muh-hu (Zoroastrian) forms of worship, since Buddhism has already been cast out, these heresies alone must not be allowed to survive. People belonging to these also are to be compelled to return to the world, belong again to their own districts, and become taxpayers. As for foreigners, let them be returned to their own countries, there to suffer restraint.

Islam was brought to China during the Tang dynasty by Arab traders but had never had much influence outside of Arab traders. It is thought that this low profile was the reason that the 845 anti-Buddhist edict spared Islam.

== Depictions in popular culture ==
In the popular Hong Kong drama Beyond the Realm of Conscience (2009), the persecution was fictionalized and dramatisized primarily through Emperor Wuzong's political paranoia rather than as a systematic anti-religious campaign. It's been shown that he feared that Emperor Xuanzong of Tang (9th century), who was also his uncle, might eventually take his throne, particularly after becoming disturbed by a prophecy or dream concerning his succession. In the drama, Li Yi was connected to Buddhism because he was believed to have taken refuge among Buddhist monks while hiding from Emperor Wuzong. Coinciding with history, when Wuzong died in 846, his successor, reversed the anti-Buddhist policies.

== See also ==
- Buddhism in China
- Four Buddhist Persecutions in China
- Persecution of Buddhists
- Langdarma, a Tibetan king who initiated persecutions against Buddhism in the same period
- Haibutsu kishaku

== Sources ==
- Reischauer, Edwin O. (1955). Ennin's Travels in Tang China. New York: Ronald Press. OCLC 412087.
- Philip, T. V. (1998). "Christianity in China". East of the Euphrates: Early Christianity in Asia. Delhi: Indian Society for Promoting Christian Knowledge and Christian Sahitya Samithy, Tiruvalla. ISBN 81-7214-441-5. Archived from the original on 2015-09-24.
