= Qianshan, Anhui =

Qianshan 潜山市 Tsienshan
- County-level city
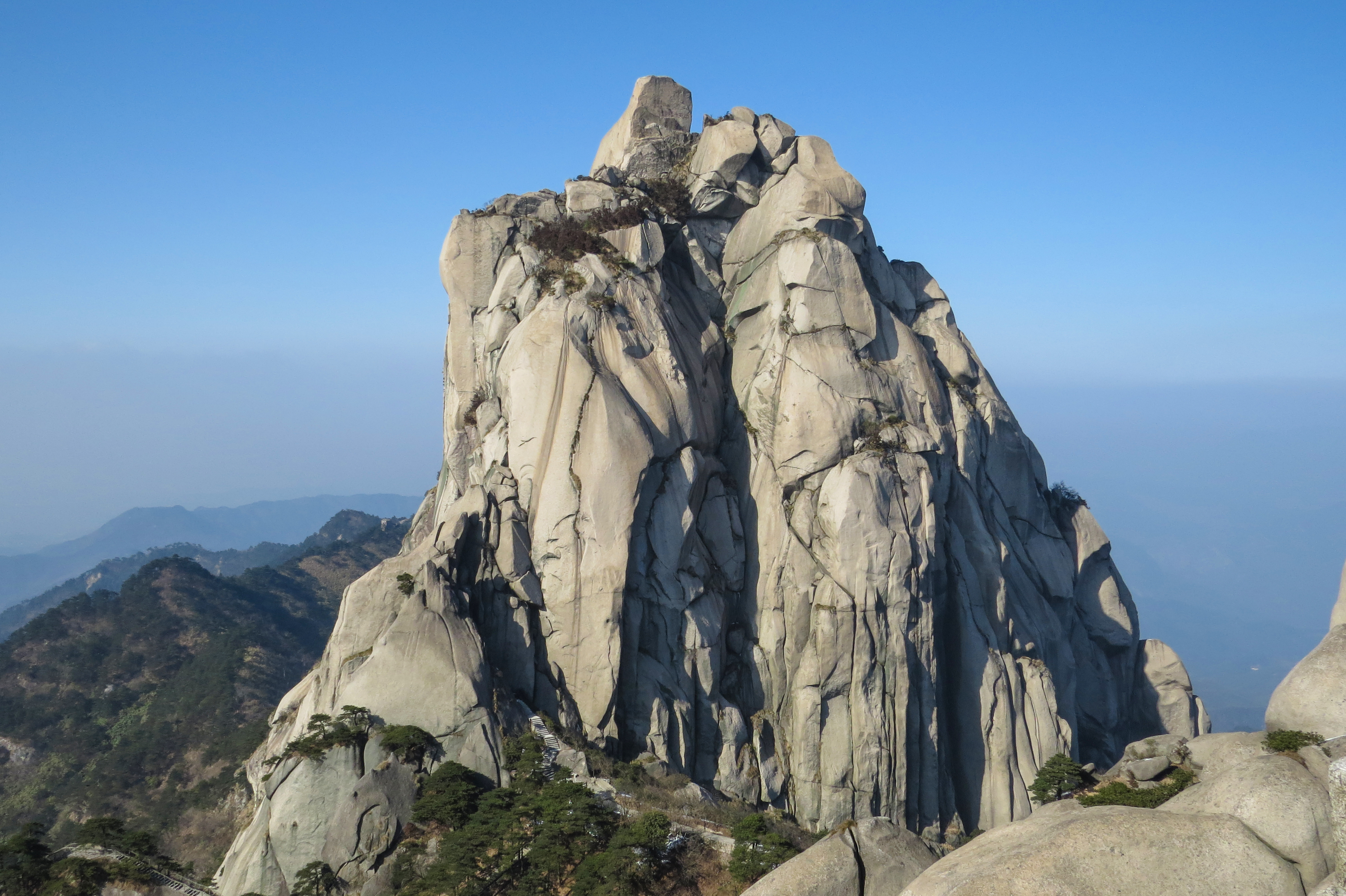
- Peak of Tianzhu Mountain

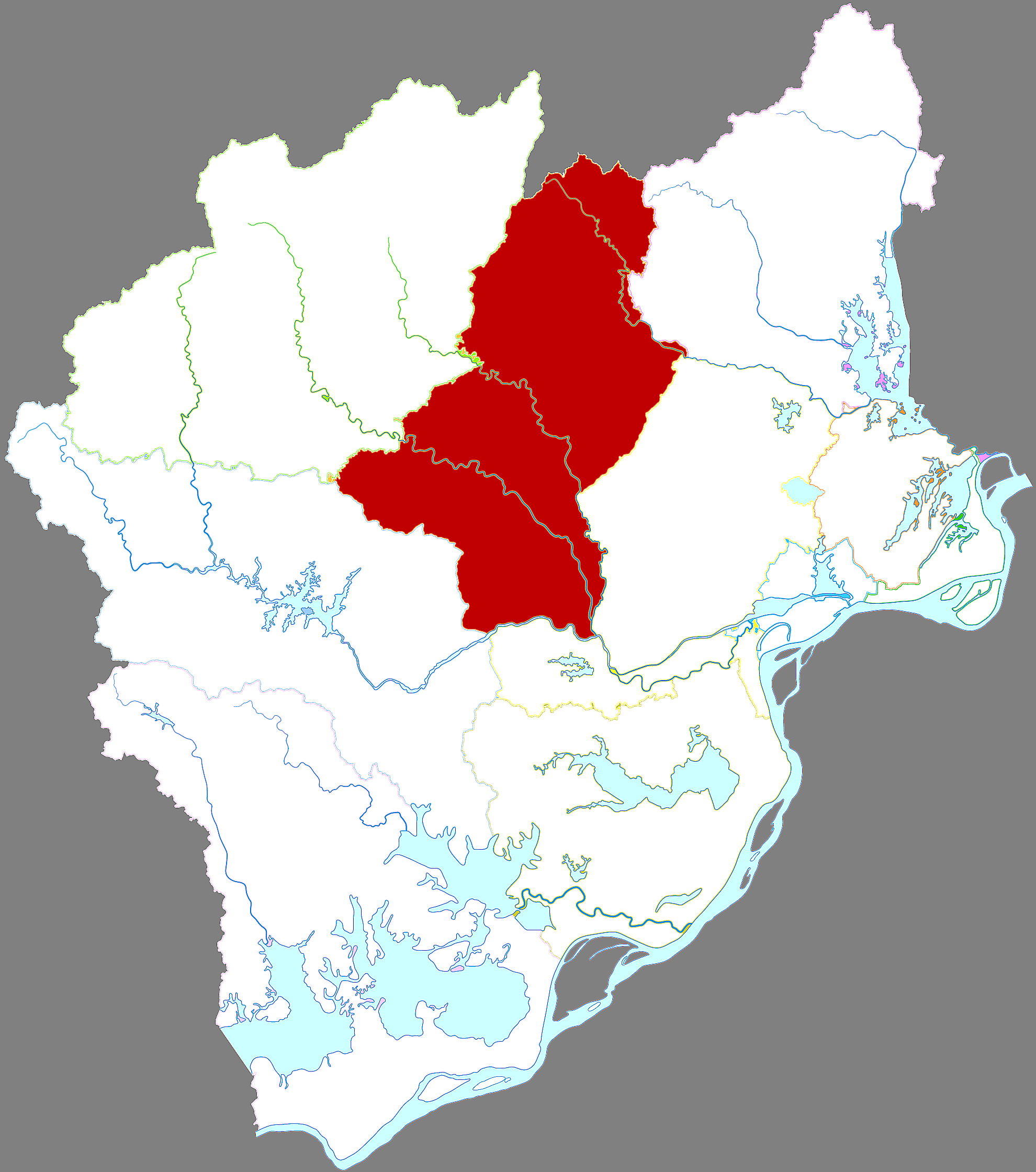
- Qianshan in Anqing

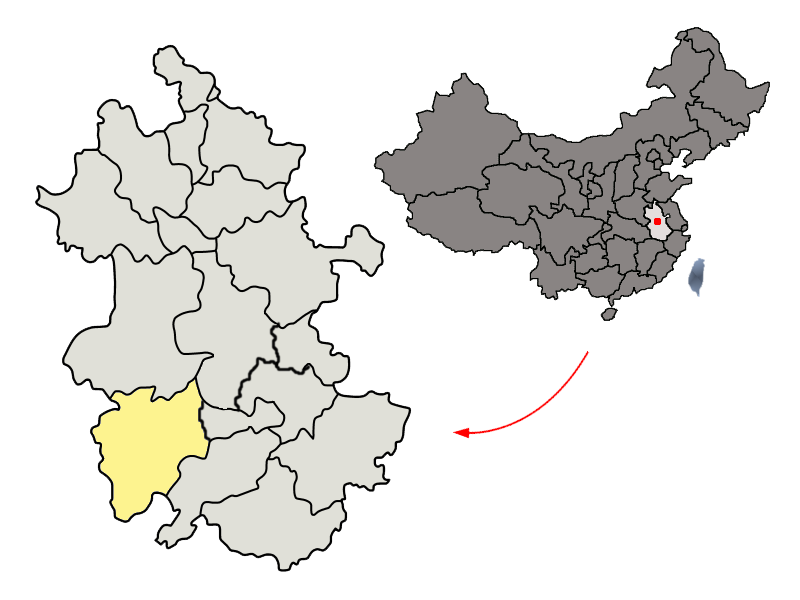
- Anqing in Anhui
- Coordinates: 30°37′52″N 116°34′52″E
- Country: China
- Province: Anhui
- Prefecture-level city: Anqing
- Municipal seat: Meicheng

Area
  - Total: 1,686.03 km^{2} (650.98 sq mi)

Population (2020)
  - Total: 441,224
  - Density: 261.694/km^{2} (677.784/sq mi)
- Time zone: UTC+8 (China Standard)
- Postal code: 246300

Qianshan (simplified Chinese: 潜山市; traditional Chinese: 潛山市; pinyin: qián shān shì) is a county-level city in the southwest of Anhui Province, China; it is under the jurisdiction of the prefecture-level city of Anqing. It has a population of 570,000 and an area of 1,686 square kilometres (651 sq mi). The government of Qianshan County is located in Meicheng Town. The well-known Wan Mountain, or Tianzhu Mountain, is located within the borders of the county.

== Administrative divisions ==
Qianshan has jurisdiction over 11 towns and 5 townships.

Towns

Meicheng (梅城镇), Yuantan (源潭镇), Yujing (余井镇), Wanghe (王河镇), Huangpu (黄铺镇), Chashui (槎水镇), Shuihou (水吼镇), Guanzhuang (官庄镇), Huangni (黄泥镇), Huangbai (黄柏镇), Tianzhushan (天柱山镇)

Townships

Tafa Township (塔畈乡), Youba Township (油坝乡), Longtan Township (龙潭乡), Doumu Township (痘姆乡), Wumiao Township (五庙乡)

others

Anhui Qianshan Economic Development Zone (安徽潜山经济开发区), Tourism Resort (旅游度假区)

== Geography ==
Lake Xuehu, noted for its lotus plants, lies in the centre of the city. The number of plants has decreased in recent years, possibly because they provide a food source for lobsters.

Wanghe Town, hometown of Xuruoyu, is in the south of the city.

The Qian River with its noted River Beach flows through Qianshan from north to south.

== Climate ==
Climate data for Qianshan, elevation 64 m (210 ft), (1991–2020 normals, extremes 1991–present)
| Month | Jan | Feb | Mar | Apr | May | Jun | Jul | Aug | Sep | Oct | Nov | Dec | Year |
|---|---|---|---|---|---|---|---|---|---|---|---|---|---|
| Record high °C (°F) | 23.7 (74.7) | 27.0 (80.6) | 30.4 (86.7) | 32.9 (91.2) | 35.2 (95.4) | 37.2 (99.0) | 39.4 (102.9) | 39.0 (102.2) | 36.5 (97.7) | 35.0 (95.0) | 29.0 (84.2) | 23.0 (73.4) | 39.4 (102.9) |
| Mean daily maximum °C (°F) | 8.3 (46.9) | 11.1 (52.0) | 15.8 (60.4) | 22.1 (71.8) | 26.8 (80.2) | 29.3 (84.7) | 32.3 (90.1) | 32.2 (90.0) | 28.5 (83.3) | 23.4 (74.1) | 17.3 (63.1) | 10.8 (51.4) | 21.5 (70.7) |
| Daily mean °C (°F) | 4.2 (39.6) | 6.7 (44.1) | 11.0 (51.8) | 17.1 (62.8) | 22.0 (71.6) | 25.1 (77.2) | 28.2 (82.8) | 27.7 (81.9) | 23.9 (75.0) | 18.4 (65.1) | 12.2 (54.0) | 6.3 (43.3) | 16.9 (62.4) |
| Mean daily minimum °C (°F) | 1.1 (34.0) | 3.3 (37.9) | 7.3 (45.1) | 12.9 (55.2) | 18.0 (64.4) | 21.7 (71.1) | 24.8 (76.6) | 24.3 (75.7) | 20.2 (68.4) | 14.4 (57.9) | 8.4 (47.1) | 2.8 (37.0) | 13.3 (55.9) |
| Record low °C (°F) | −9.4 (15.1) | −7.2 (19.0) | −3.4 (25.9) | 2.5 (36.5) | 9.5 (49.1) | 15.3 (59.5) | 16.6 (61.9) | 16.3 (61.3) | 11.0 (51.8) | 3.7 (38.7) | −3.6 (25.5) | −11.8 (10.8) | −11.8 (10.8) |
| Average precipitation mm (inches) | 55.9 (2.20) | 73.8 (2.91) | 106.1 (4.18) | 145.6 (5.73) | 183.8 (7.24) | 276.6 (10.89) | 239.8 (9.44) | 146.6 (5.77) | 76.8 (3.02) | 53.1 (2.09) | 58.0 (2.28) | 35.1 (1.38) | 1,451.2 (57.13) |
| Average precipitation days (≥ 0.1 mm) | 10.6 | 10.9 | 13.8 | 12.8 | 13.1 | 14.0 | 13.4 | 12.5 | 7.5 | 7.8 | 8.6 | 8.0 | 133 |
| Average snowy days | 4.0 | 2.0 | 0.7 | 0 | 0 | 0 | 0 | 0 | 0 | 0 | 0.2 | 1.1 | 8 |
| Average relative humidity (%) | 72 | 72 | 72 | 72 | 74 | 81 | 82 | 80 | 75 | 71 | 72 | 70 | 74 |
| Mean monthly sunshine hours | 105.3 | 105.2 | 126.4 | 153.5 | 165.5 | 144.4 | 194.4 | 201.1 | 172.2 | 162.5 | 142.7 | 127.6 | 1,800.8 |
| Percentage possible sunshine | 33 | 33 | 34 | 39 | 39 | 34 | 45 | 49 | 47 | 46 | 45 | 41 | 40 |
Source: China Meteorological Administration

Climate data for Tianzhu Mountain, Qianshan, elevation 968 m (3,176 ft), (1991–2020 normals)
| Month | Jan | Feb | Mar | Apr | May | Jun | Jul | Aug | Sep | Oct | Nov | Dec | Year |
|---|---|---|---|---|---|---|---|---|---|---|---|---|---|
| Mean daily maximum °C (°F) | 3.9 (39.0) | 6.6 (43.9) | 11.9 (53.4) | 17.4 (63.3) | 21.7 (71.1) | 23.6 (74.5) | 26.2 (79.2) | 26.5 (79.7) | 22.7 (72.9) | 18.0 (64.4) | 12.7 (54.9) | 6.6 (43.9) | 16.5 (61.7) |
| Daily mean °C (°F) | 0.3 (32.5) | 2.7 (36.9) | 7.5 (45.5) | 12.8 (55.0) | 17.4 (63.3) | 20.1 (68.2) | 22.8 (73.0) | 22.7 (72.9) | 18.8 (65.8) | 13.8 (56.8) | 8.5 (47.3) | 2.5 (36.5) | 12.5 (54.5) |
| Mean daily minimum °C (°F) | −2.6 (27.3) | −0.4 (31.3) | 3.9 (39.0) | 9.0 (48.2) | 13.8 (56.8) | 17.2 (63.0) | 20.5 (68.9) | 20.1 (68.2) | 15.9 (60.6) | 10.5 (50.9) | 5 (41) | −0.7 (30.7) | 9.4 (48.8) |
| Average precipitation mm (inches) | 62.3 (2.45) | 89.4 (3.52) | 125.2 (4.93) | 163.6 (6.44) | 238.0 (9.37) | 315.8 (12.43) | 370.9 (14.60) | 225.6 (8.88) | 123.0 (4.84) | 79.5 (3.13) | 65.6 (2.58) | 45.9 (1.81) | 1,904.8 (74.98) |
| Average precipitation days (≥ 0.1 mm) | 12.3 | 13.2 | 14.0 | 13.5 | 14.3 | 16.0 | 16.2 | 15.1 | 11.6 | 11.0 | 11.5 | 9.1 | 157.8 |
| Average snowy days | 8.3 | 4.8 | 3.4 | 0.3 | 0 | 0 | 0 | 0 | 0 | 0 | 1.1 | 4.2 | 22.1 |
| Average relative humidity (%) | 72 | 76 | 73 | 72 | 76 | 87 | 90 | 88 | 83 | 74 | 71 | 65 | 77 |
| Mean monthly sunshine hours | 104.7 | 100.0 | 131.4 | 148.6 | 146.6 | 94.5 | 113.1 | 139.2 | 120.8 | 149.7 | 142.2 | 137.8 | 1,528.6 |
| Percentage possible sunshine | 33 | 32 | 35 | 38 | 34 | 22 | 26 | 34 | 33 | 43 | 45 | 44 | 35 |
Source: China Meteorological Administration

== History ==
The Two Qiaos, two sisters from the Three Kingdoms era were from Wan County, Lujiang Commandery (present-day Qianshan, Anhui).
