= Timeline of the gunpowder age =

This is a timeline of the history of gunpowder and related topics such as weapons, warfare, and industrial applications. The timeline covers the history of gunpowder from the first hints of its origin as a Taoist alchemical product in China until its replacement by smokeless powder in the late 19th century (from 1884 to the present day).

== Pre-gunpowder formula ==
Major developments: Earliest stage of gunpowder development. Mentions of gunpowder ingredients and their uses in conjunction with each other.

Year	Date	Region	Event
142		China	A Taoist text known as the Cantong qi, or the Book of the Kinship of Three, by Wei Boyang, who lived in the Eastern Han dynasty, mentions a combination of three powders that fly and dance violently.
318		China	The ingredients of gunpowder are recorded in the Baopuzi, also known as The Master Who Embraces Simplicity, by Taoist philosopher Ge Hong, who lived in the Jin dynasty (266–420). It describes experiments to create gold with heated saltpeter, pine resin, and charcoal among other carbon materials, resulting in a purple powder and arsenic vapours.
492		China	Tao Hongjing, a Taoist alchemist, notes that saltpeter burns with a purple flame.
756		China	The Taoist Mao Kua reports in his Pinglongren (Recognition of the Recumbent Dragon) that by heating saltpeter, the yin of the air can be obtained, which combines with sulphur, carbon, and metals other than gold.

== 9th century ==
Major developments: Earliest definite references to a gunpowder formula and awareness of its danger.

Year	Date	Region	Event
808		China	The Taoist priest Qing Xuzi mentions the gunpowder formula in his Taishang Shengzu Jindan Mijue, describing six parts sulfur to six parts saltpeter to one part birthwort herb.
858		China	The Taoist text Zhenyuan miaodao yaolüe (Classified Essentials of the Mysterious Way of the True Origin of Things) contains a warning on the dangers of gunpowder: "Some have heated together sulfur, realgar (arsenic disulphide), and saltpeter with honey; smoke [and flames] result, so that their hands and faces have been burnt, and even the whole house burned down."

== 10th century ==
Major developments: Gunpowder is utilized in Chinese warfare and an assortment of gunpowder weapons appear. Fire arrows utilizing gunpowder as an incendiary appear in the early 900s and possibly rocket arrows as well by the end of the century. The gunpowder slow match is used for igniting flame throwers. The ancestor of firearms, the fire lance, also appears, but its usage in the 10th century is uncertain and no textual evidence for it exists during this period.

Year	Date	Region	Event
904		China	Fire arrows utilizing gunpowder are used by Southern Wu troops during the siege of Yuzhang.
919		China	The gunpowder slow match appears in China (for igniting flamethrowers).
950		China	Fire lances appear in China.
969		China	Gunpowder propelled fire arrows, rocket arrows, are invented by Yue Yifang and Feng Jisheng.
975		China	The state of Wuyue sends a group of soldiers skilled in the use of fire arrows to the Song dynasty, which uses fire arrows and incendiary bombs in the same year to destroy the fleet of Southern Tang.
994		China	The Liao dynasty attacks the Song dynasty and lays siege to Zitong with 100,000 troops, but fails due to the defenders' use of fire arrows.
1000		China	Tang Fu demonstrates gunpowder pots and caltrops to the Song court and is rewarded.

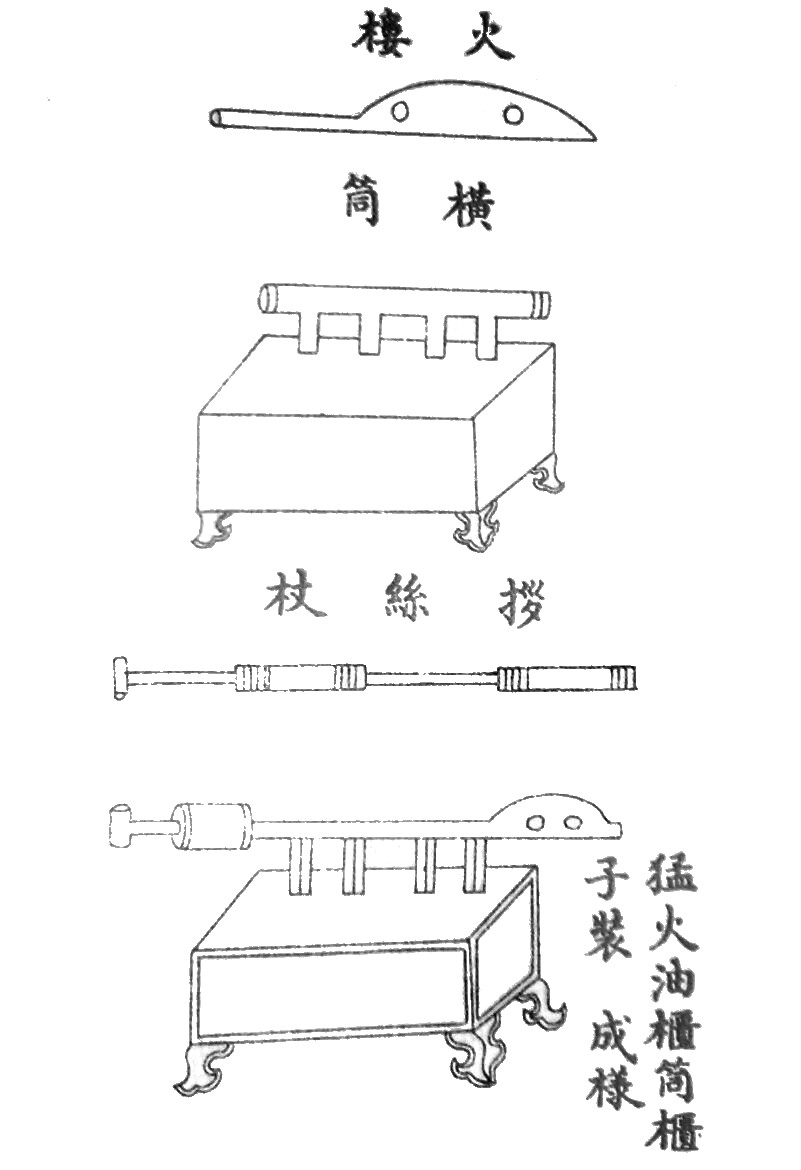
A flamethrower from the Wujing Zongyao, supposedly used the gunpowder slow match

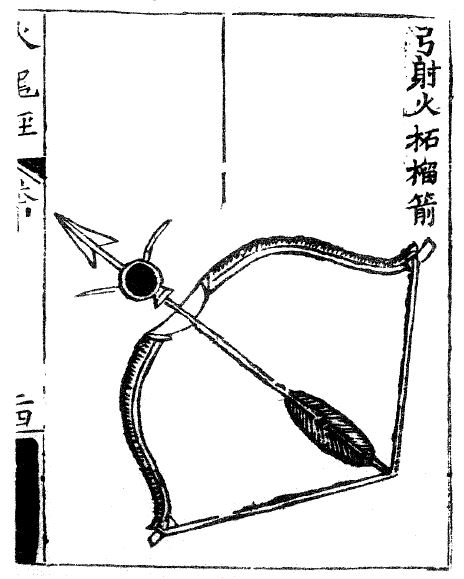
An arrow strapped with gunpowder ready to be shot from a bow. From the Huolongjing

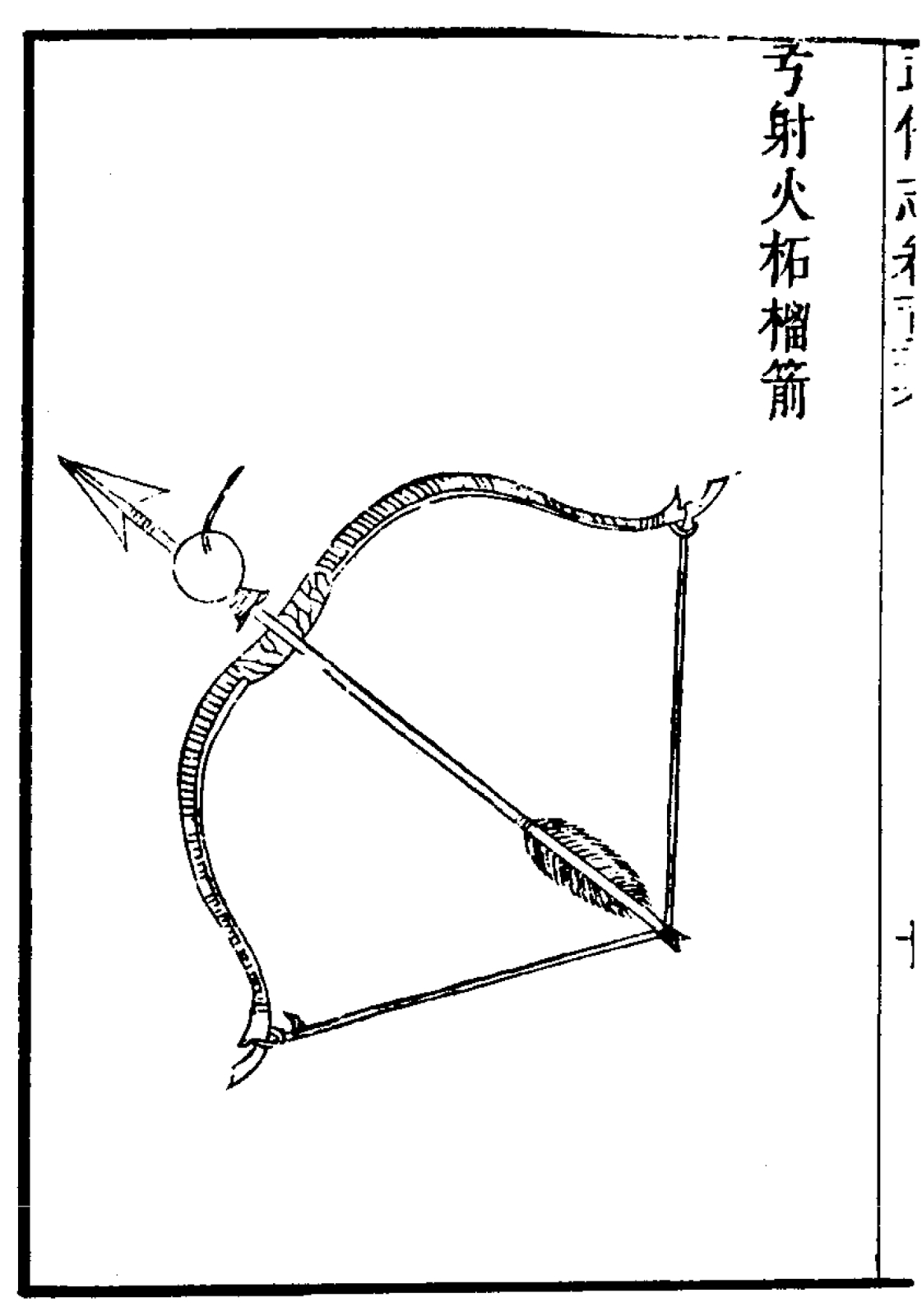
A fire arrow from the Wubei Zhi

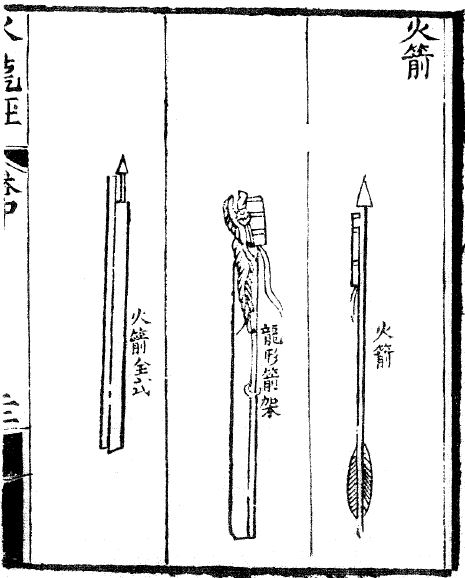
Rocket arrows from the Huolongjing.

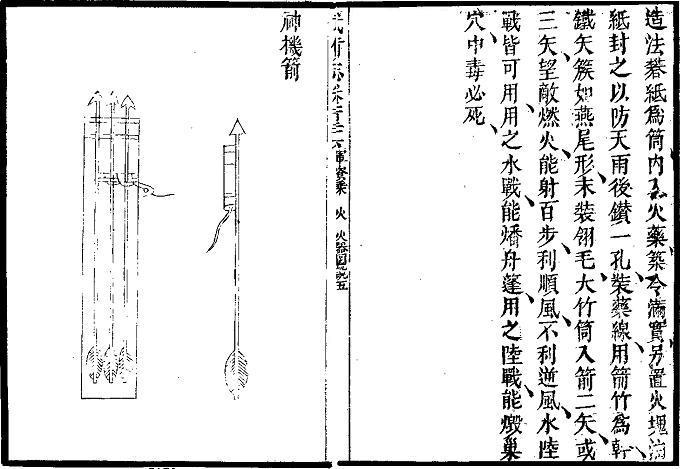
Depiction of fire arrows known as "divine engine arrows" (shen ji jian 神機箭) from the Wubei Zhi.

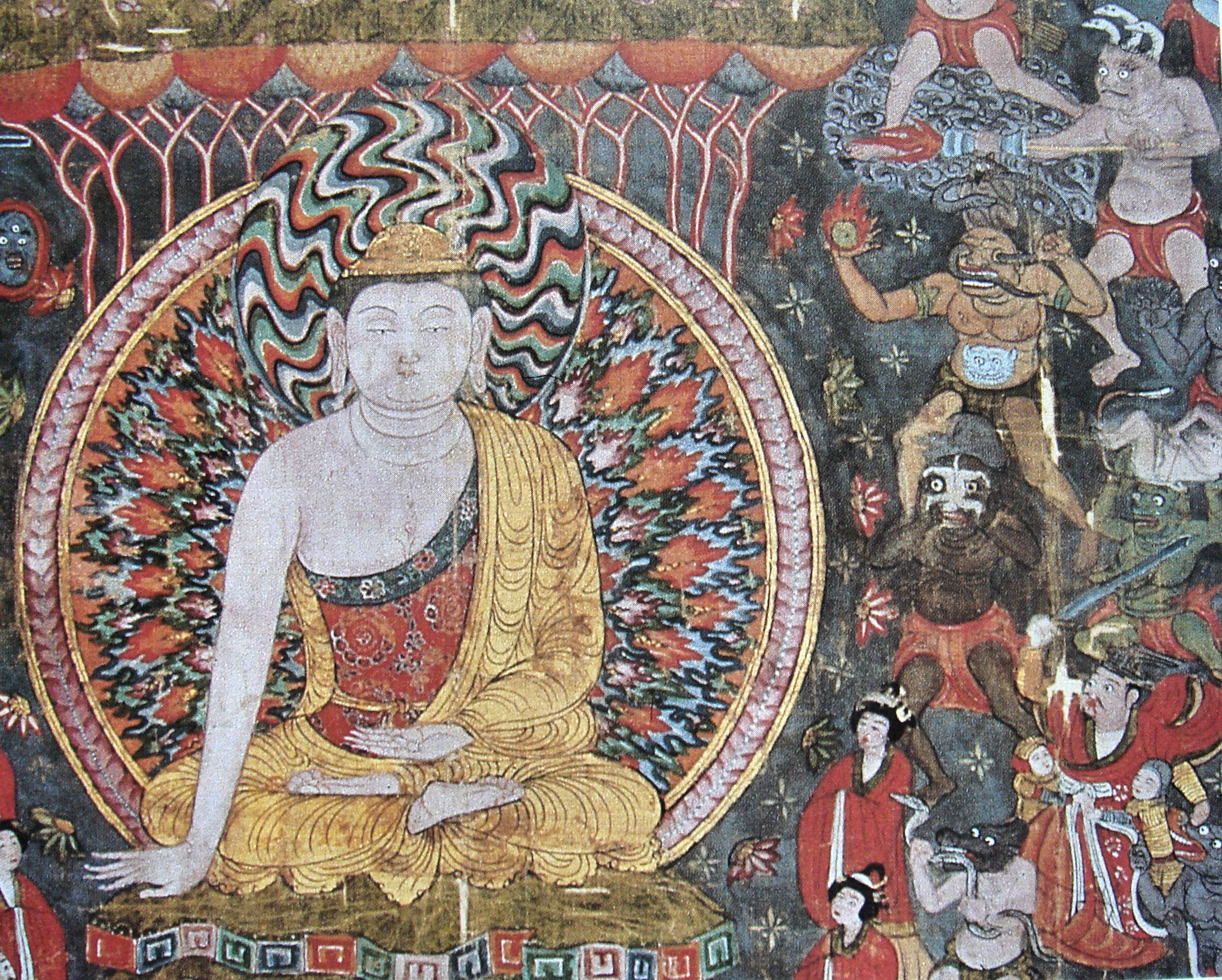
Earliest known representation of a bomb and fire lance (upper right), Dunhuang, 950 AD.

== 11th century ==
Major developments: The chemical formula for gunpowder is recorded in the Wujing Zongyao by 1044. Bombs appear in the early 11th century. Gunpowder becomes more common in the Song dynasty and production of gunpowder weapons is systematized. The Song court restricts trade of gunpowder ingredients with the Liao and Western Xia dynasties.

Year	Date	Region	Event
1002		China	Shi Pu demonstrates fireballs utilizing gunpowder to the Song court and blueprints are created for promulgation throughout the realm.
1044		China	The chemical formula for gunpowder appears in the military manual Wujing Zongyao, also known as the Complete Essentials for the Military Classics.
1044		China	"Thunderclap bombs" are mentioned in the Wujing Zongyao.
1044		China	A "triple-bed-crossbow" firing fire arrows is mentioned in the Wujing Zongyao.
1067		China	Private trade of gunpowder ingredients is banned in the Song dynasty.
1075		Sinosphere	Vietnam's Lý dynasty used fire arrows against the Song dynasty during the Lý–Song War (1075–1077).
1076		China	Trade of gunpowder ingredients with the Liao and Western Xia dynasties is outlawed by the Song court.
1083		China	Three hundred thousand fire arrows are produced by the Song court and delivered to two garrisons.

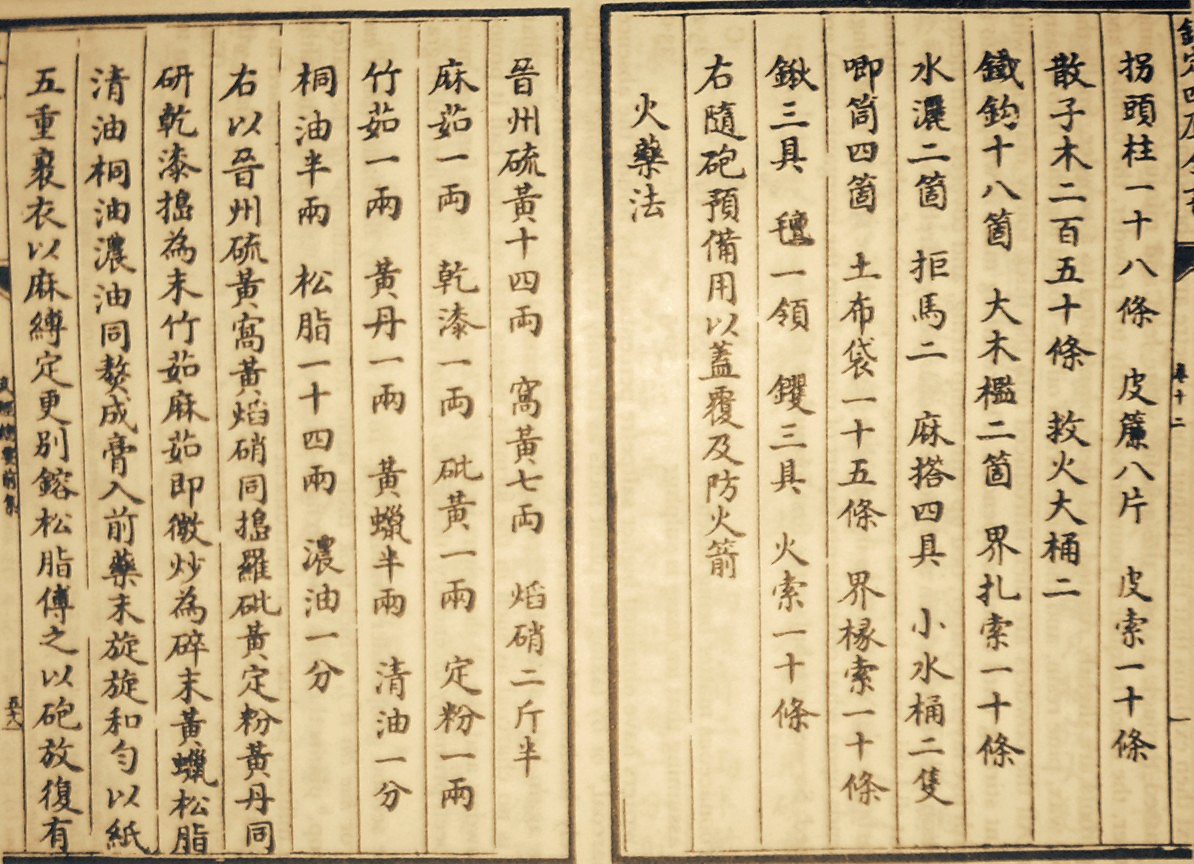
Earliest known written formula for gunpowder, from the Wujing Zongyao of 1044 AD.

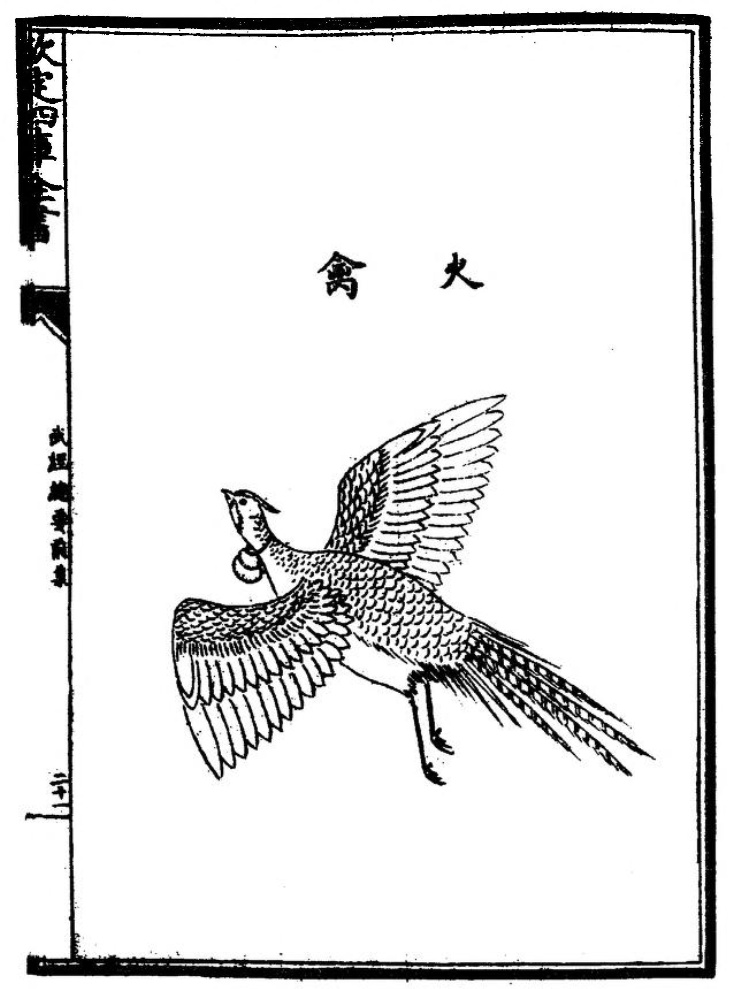
An expendable bird carrying an incendiary receptacle around its neck. From the Wujing Zongyao.

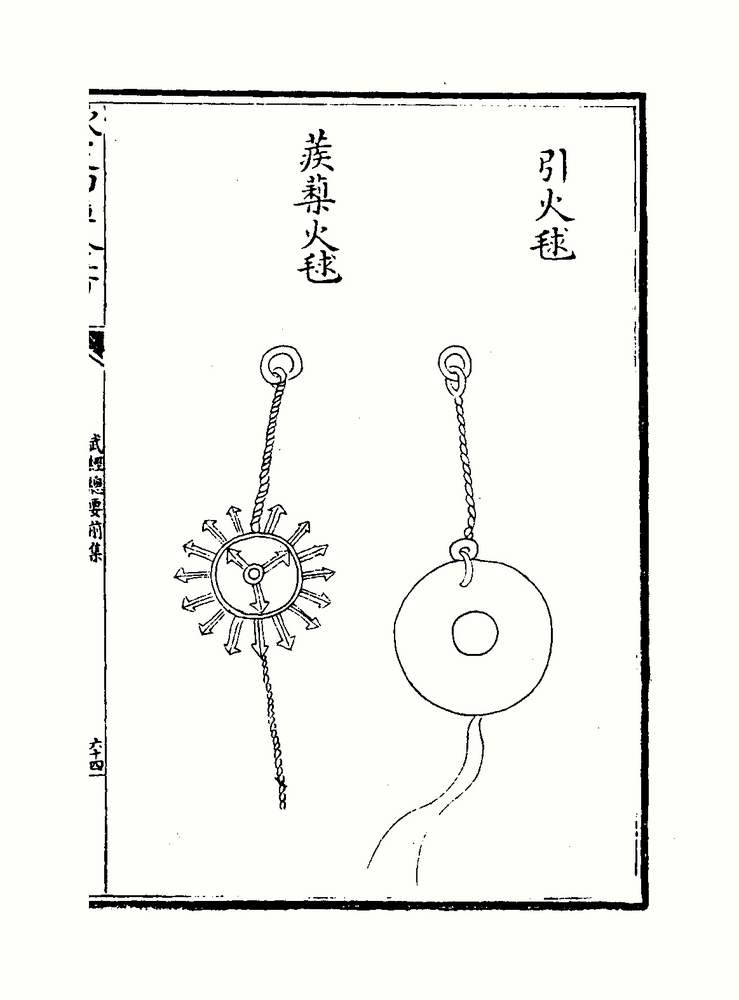
An 'igniter fire ball' and 'barbed fire ball' from the Wujing Zongyao.

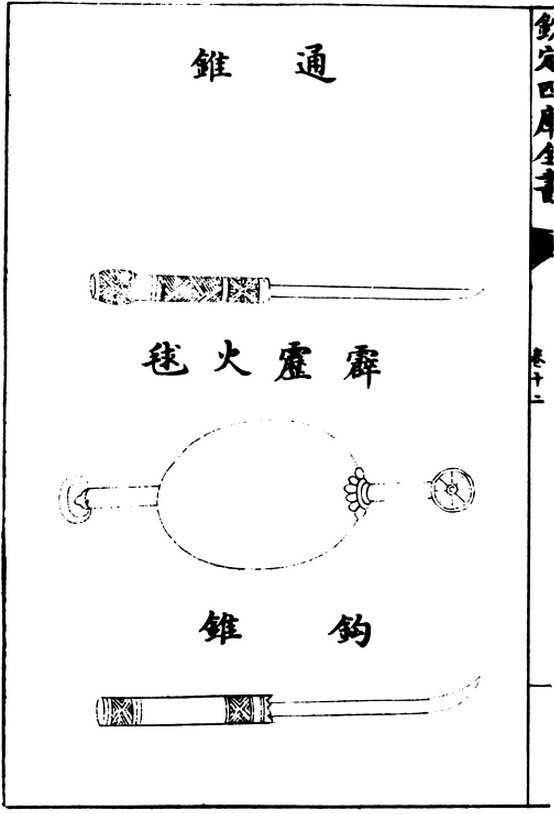
A thunderclap bomb as depicted in the Wujing Zongyao.

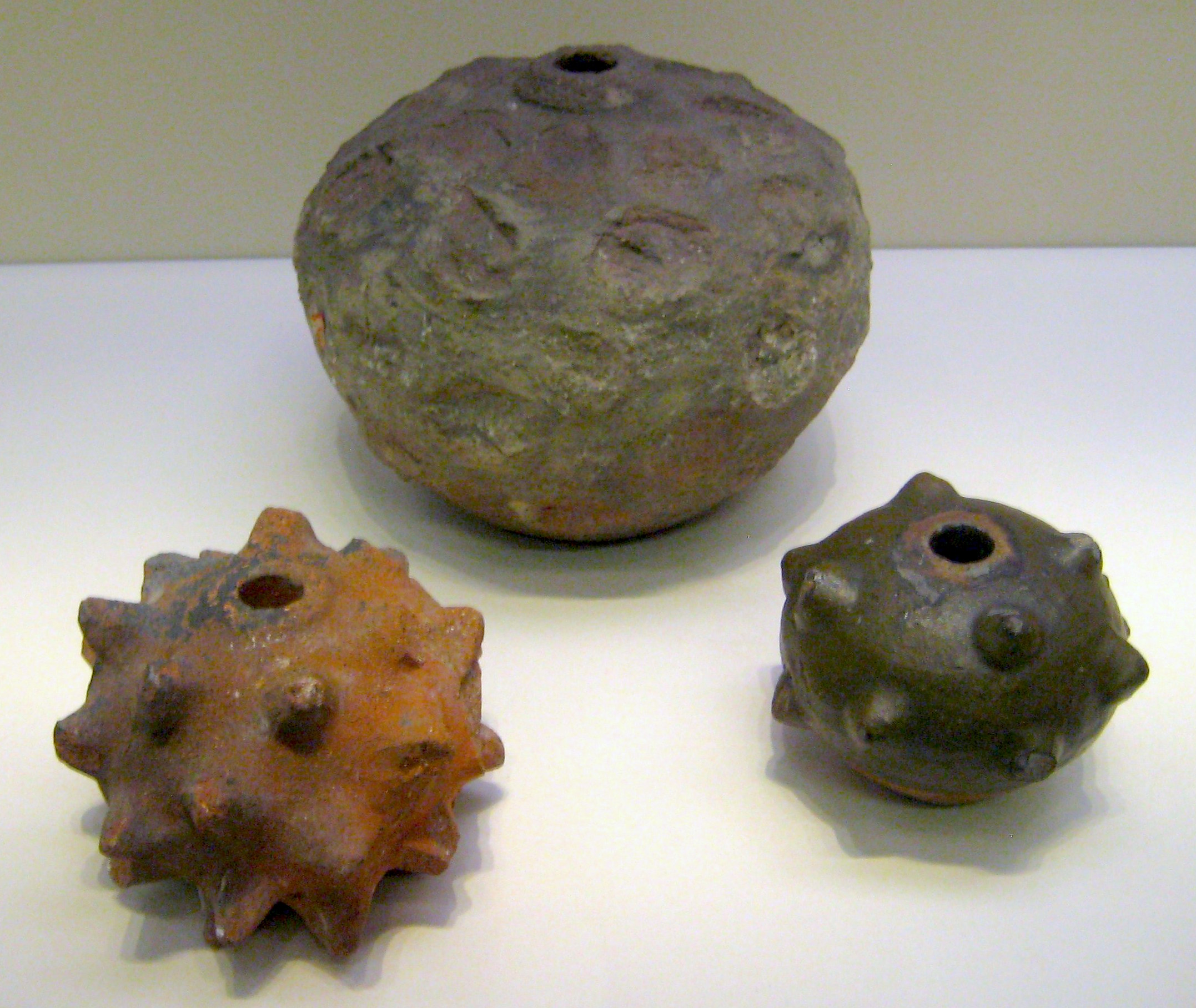
Gunpowder pot and caltrops from the Yuan dynasty.

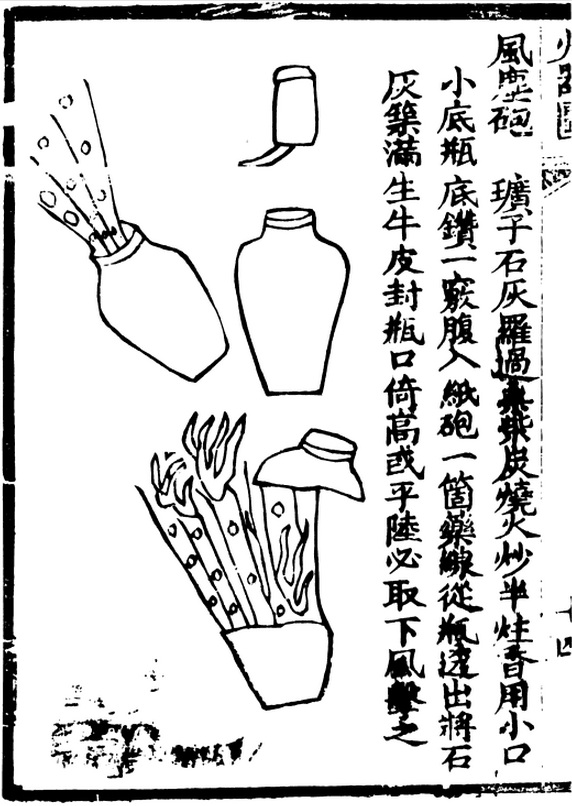
Depiction of a' wind-and-dust bomb' (feng chen pao) from the Huolongjing.

== 12th century ==
Major developments: Gunpowder fireworks are mentioned. Ships are equipped with trebuchets for hurling bombs. Earliest recorded usage of gunpowder artillery in ship to ship combat, first mention of the fire lance in battle, and the earliest possible depiction of a cannon appears.

Year	Date	Region	Event
1110		China	The Song army puts on a firework display for the emperor including a spectacle which opened with "a noise like thunder" and explosives that light up the night. Considered by some to be the first mention of gunpowder fireworks.
1126	February	China	Jingkang Incident: Thunderclap bomb as well as fire arrows and fire bombs are used by Song troops during the siege of Kaifeng by the Jin dynasty (1115–1234).
1127	December	China	"Molten metal bombs", suspected to contain gunpowder, are employed by Song troops when the Jin army returns with fire arrows and gunpowder bombs made by captured Song artisans. Kaifeng is taken.
1128		China	The earliest extant depiction of a cannon appears among the Dazu Rock Carvings, one of which is a human figure holding a gourd shaped hand cannon.
1129		China	Gunpowder weapons are applied to naval warfare as Song warships are outfitted with trebuchets and supplies of gunpowder bombs.
1132		China	Siege of De'an: Fire lances are used by Song troops.
1132		China	Gunpowder is referred to specifically for its military applications for the first time and is known as "fire bomb medicine" rather than "fire medicine".
1132		China	Firecrackers using gunpowder are mentioned for the first time.
1159		China	Fire arrows are employed by a Song fleet in sinking a Jin fleet off the shore of Shandong peninsula.
1161	26–27 November	China	Battle of Caishi: Thunderclap bombs are employed by Song treadmill boats in sinking a Jin fleet on the Yangtze.
1163		China	Fire lances are attached to war carts, known as "at-your-desire-war-carts", for defending Song mobile trebuchets.

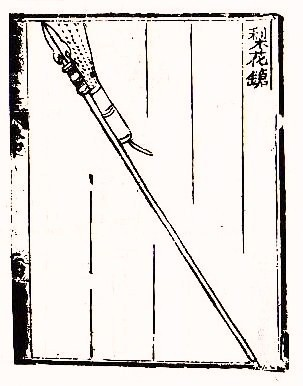
A fire lance from the Huolongjing.

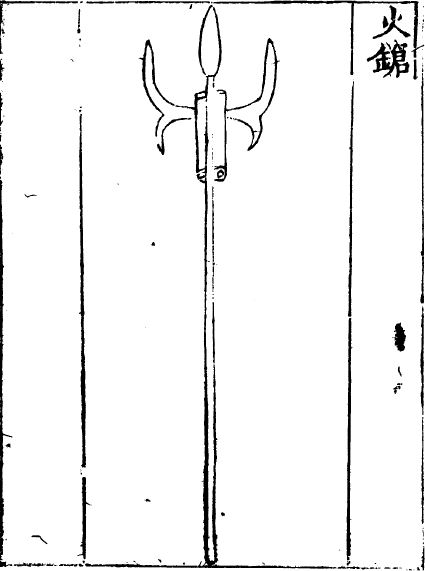
A double barreled fire lance from the Huolongjing. Supposedly they fired in succession, and the second one is lit automatically after the first barrel finishes firing.

== 13th century ==
Major developments: Bomb shells gain an iron casing. Fire lances are equipped with projectiles and reusable iron barrels. Rockets are used in warfare. "Fire emitting tubes" are produced in the Song dynasty by the mid-13th century and hand cannons are recorded to have been used in battle by the Yuan dynasty in 1287. The earliest extant cannons appear in China. The Mongols spread gunpowder weaponry to Japan, Southeast Asia, and possibly the Middle East as well as Europe. Europe and India both acquire gunpowder by the end of the century, but only in the Middle East are gunpowder weapons mentioned in any detail.

Year	Date	Region	Event
1207		China	Thunderclap bombs are employed by Song forces in a sneak attack on a Jin camp, killing 2000 men and 800 horses.
1221		China	Iron casing bombs are employed by Jin troops in the siege of Qi Prefecture (Hubei).
1227		China	The Wuwei Bronze Cannon, excavated in 1980, is dated to the Western Xia (1038–1227) period. It is currently the oldest possible extant cannon, however like the Heilongjiang hand cannon it contains no inscription and dating is based on contextual evidence.
1230		China	Co-viative projectiles are added to fire lances.
1231		China	"Thunder crash bombs" are employed by Jin troops in destroying a Mongol warship.
1232		China	Reusable fire lance barrels made of durable paper are employed by Jin troops during the Siege of Kaifeng (1232).
1232		China	"Flying fire-lances" with re-usable barrels are used in the defense of Bianjing against Mongols. Some interpret these to be rockets.
1237		China	Large bombs requiring several hundred men to hurl using trebuchets are employed by Mongols in the siege of Anfeng (modern Shouxian, Anhui).
1240		Middle East	The Middle East acquires knowledge of saltpeter (Chinese snow).
1241		West	Chronicle records the use of pyrotechnic weapons against the Polish prince Henry by the Mongols in the Battle of Legnica in 1241. The same technology must have also been used same year during the Mongol invasion of Hungary
1245		China	Rockets are used during a military exercise conducted by the Song navy.
1257		China	Three hundred thirty-three "fire emitting tubes" are produced in a Song arsenal in Jiankang Prefecture (Nanjing, Jiangsu).
1258		India	In India, gunpowder is used in pyrotechnics.
1259		China	The History of Song describes a "fire-emitting lance" employing a pellet wad projectile which occludes the barrel. Some consider this to be the first bullet.
1259		China	The city of Qingzhou produces one to two thousand iron cased bomb shells a month and sends them in deliveries of ten to twenty thousand at a time to Xiangyang and Yingzhou.
1264		China	A display of miniature rockets frightens the Song empress.
1267		West	In Europe gunpowder in the form of a firecracker is mentioned in textual sources by Roger Bacon, in his Opus Majus.
1272		China	Battle of Xiangyang: Fire lances are used by a Song riverine relief force to repel boarders.
1276		China	The "lance" in fire lance is written with the "metal" radical instead of the "wood" radical, suggesting that the barrels employed by the Song army are made of metal.
1276		China	Fire lances are used by Song cavalry in combating Mongols.
1277		China	A suicide bombing occurs in China when Song garrisons set off a large bomb, killing themselves.
1280		China	"Eruptors," cannons firing co-viative projectiles, are employed in the Yuan dynasty.
1280		China	A major accidental explosion occurs in China when a Yuan gunpowder storehouse at Weiyang, Yangzhou catches fire and explodes, killing 100 guards and hurling building materials over 5 km away.
1280		Middle East	The Middle East acquires fire lances and rockets. Hasan al-Rammah writes, in Arabic, recipes for gunpowder, instructions for the purification of saltpeter, and descriptions of gunpowder incendiaries. He also provides a description and illustration of the world's first torpedo.
1280		West	Europe acquires the gunpowder formula.
1281		Sinosphere	Bombs are employed by Mongols in the Mongol invasions of Japan.
1287		China	Hand cannons are employed by the troops of Yuan Jurchen commander Li Ting in putting down a rebellion by Mongol prince Nayan.
1288		China	The Heilongjiang hand cannon is dated to this year based on contextual evidence and its proximity to the rebellion by Mongol prince Nayan, although it contains no inscription.
1293		Southeast Asia	Mongol troops of Yuan dynasty carried Chinese cannons to Java in 1293.
1298		China	The Xanadu Gun, the oldest confirmed extant hand cannon, is dated to this year based on its inscription and contextual evidence.
1299		Middle East	Fire lances are used in battles between the Mongols and Muslims
1300		India	In India Mongol mercenaries deploy fire arrows during a siege.

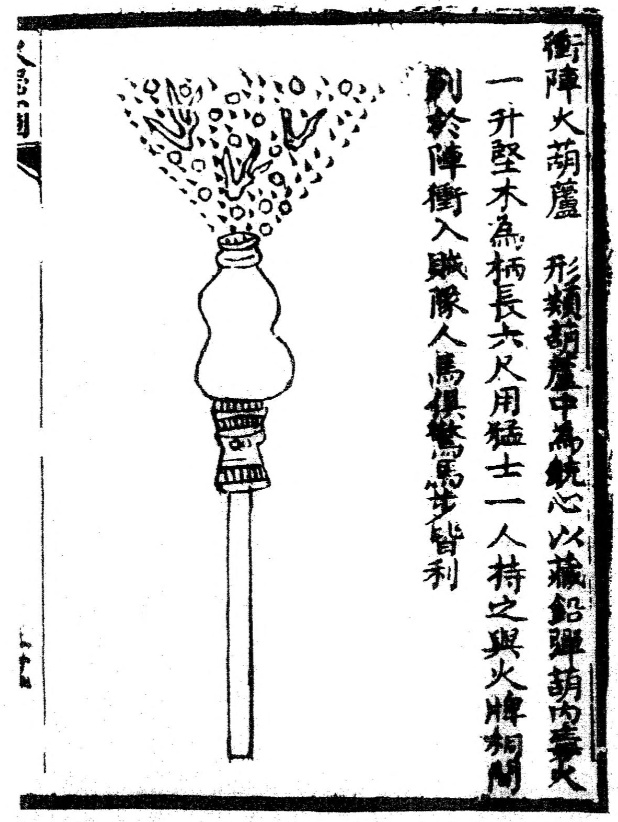
The 'phalanx-charging fire-gourd' forgoes the spearhead and relies solely on the force of gunpowder and projectiles. From the Huolongjing.

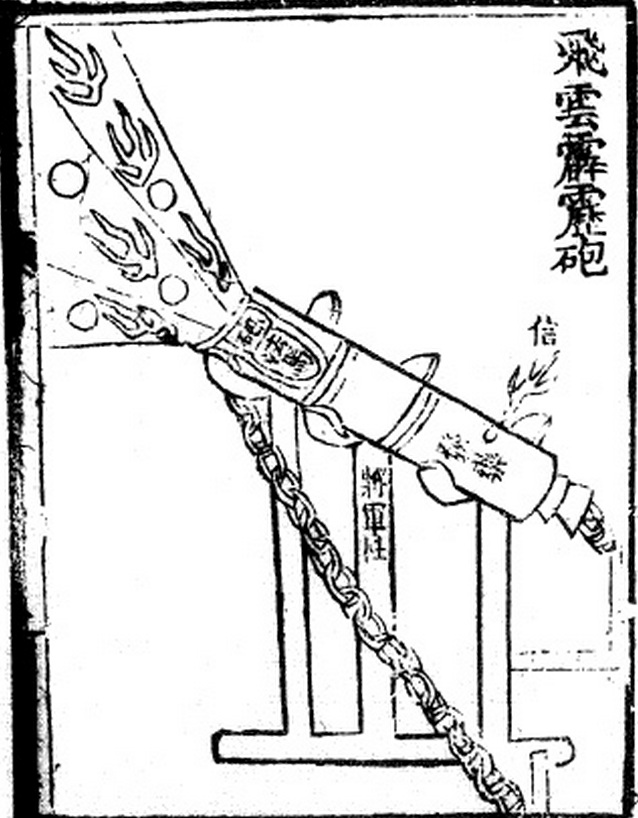
An illustration of a 'flying-cloud thunderclap-eruptor,' a cannon firing thunderclap bombs, from the Huolongjing.

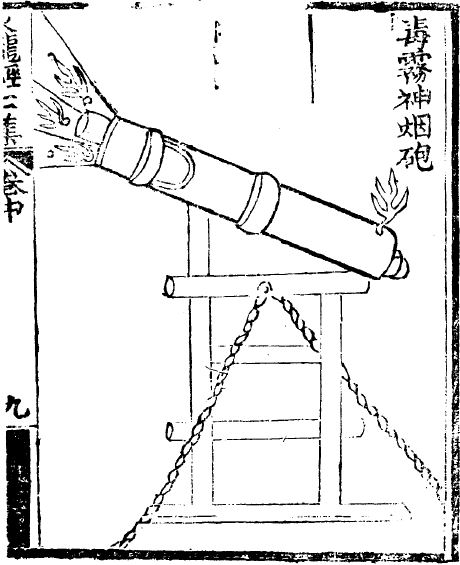
A 'poison fog divine smoke eruptor' (du wu shen yan pao) as depicted in the Huolongjing. Small shells emitting poisonous smoke are fired.

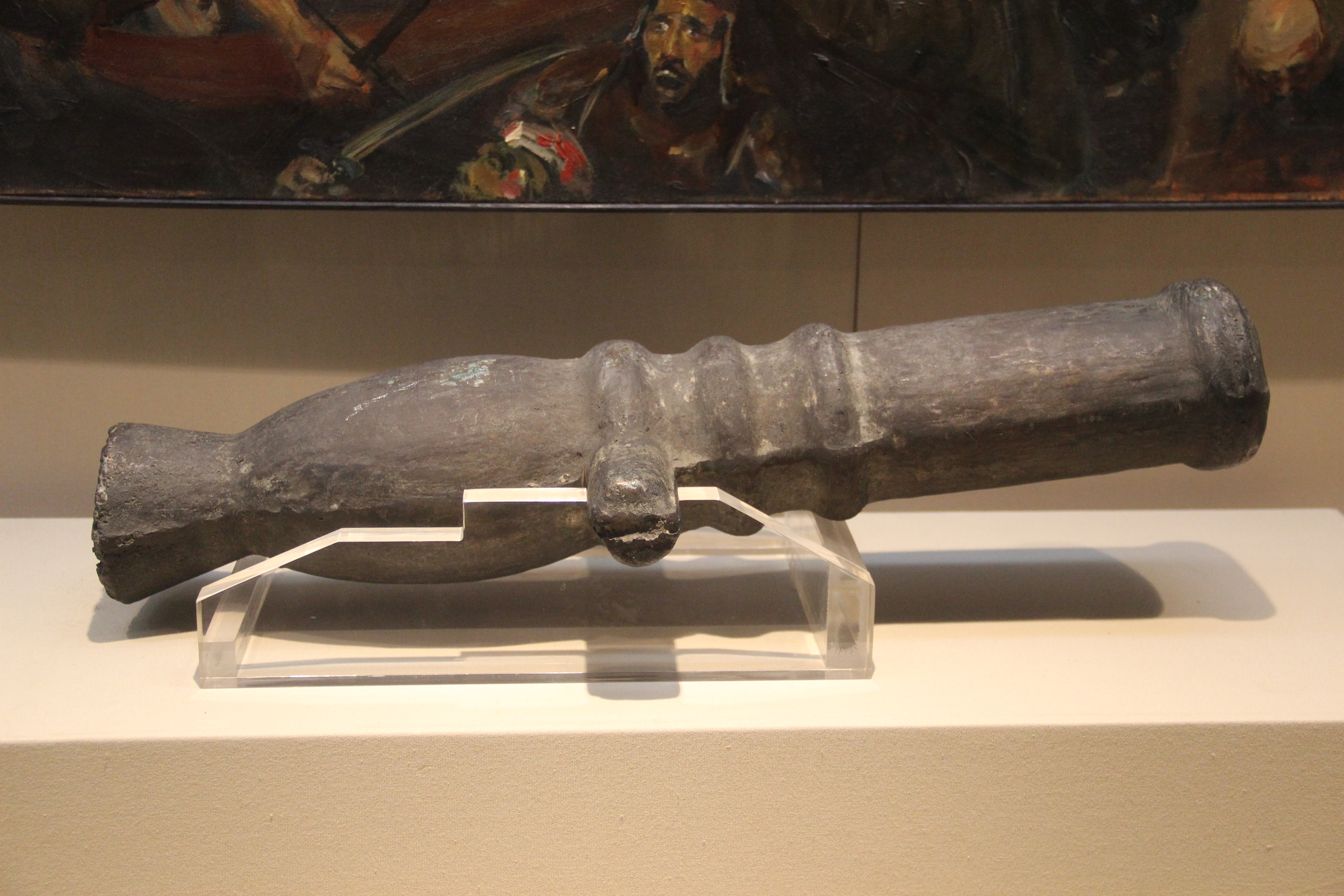
Cannon with trunnions, Yuan Dynasty (1271–1368)

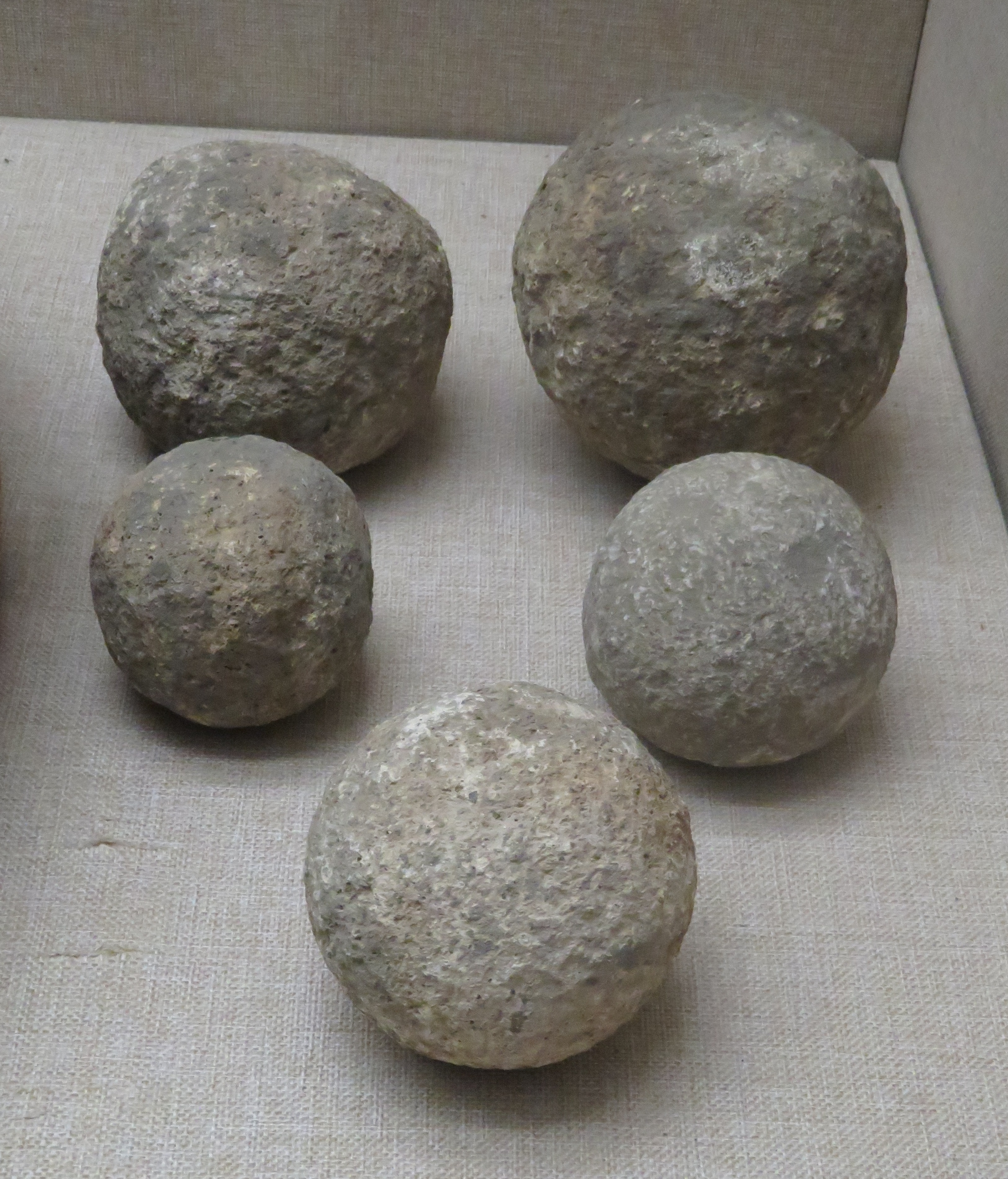
Stone cannon balls unearthed in Shangdu, Yuan Dynasty (1271–1368)

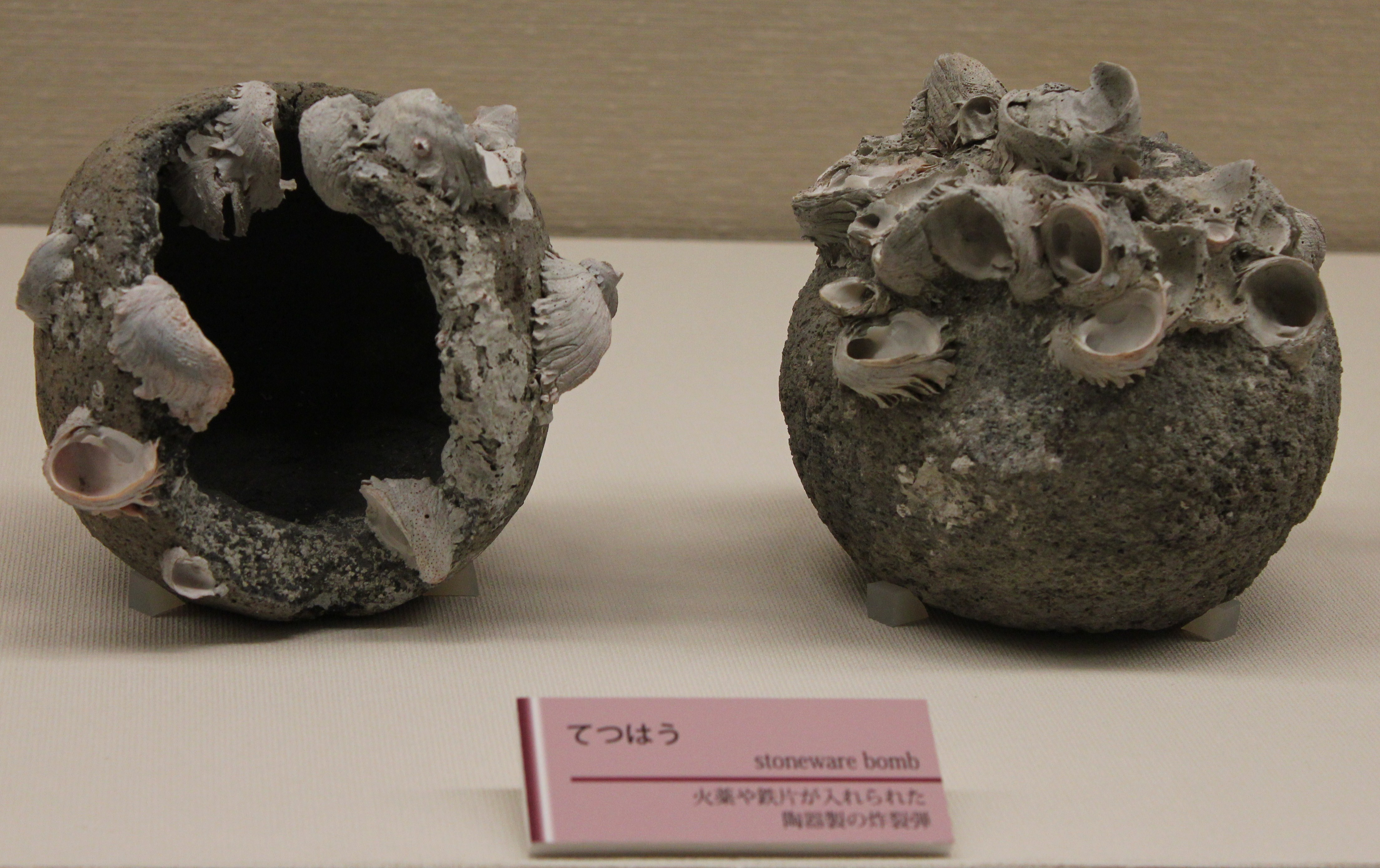
Yuan dynasty bombs, known in Japanese as Tetsuhau (iron bomb), or in Chinese as Zhentianlei (thunder crash bomb), dated to the Mongol invasions of Japan (1271–1284).

== 14th century ==
Major developments: Chinese gunpowder weaponry continues to advance with the development of one-piece cast iron cannons, accompanying carriages, and the addition of land mines, naval mines and rocket launchers. Earliest recorded instance of volley fire with gunpowder weaponry, by the Ming dynasty. The rest of the world catches up quickly and most of Eurasia acquires gunpowder weapons by the second half of the 14th century. Cannon development in Europe progresses rapidly and by 1374, cannons in Europe are able to breach a city wall for the first time. Breech loading cannons appear in Europe.

Year	Date	Region	Event
1307		West	The Armenian monk Hetoum writes about a powerful weapon having been invented in China.
1325		China	Bronze "thousand-ball thunder-cannons" on four wheeled carriages appear in the Yuan dynasty.
1326		West	In Europe the depiction of a cannon appears.
1330		West	In Andalusia cannons are mentioned in textual sources.
1330		West	Europe's oldest extant firearm, the Loshult gun, is dated to this year.
1331		Iberia	The Nasrid army besieging Elche makes use of "iron pellets shot with fire."
1333		West	Earliest extant cannon arrow projectile is dated to this year. Now kept in the Eltz Castle.
1338		West	An organ gun and three pounds of gunpowder are recorded to have been in the possession of a raiding party that sacked Southampton.
1339		West	The word "cannon", derived from the Greek kanun and Latin canna, meaning "tube," is used for the first time in Europe.
1339		West	The word "gun" is used to describe a firearm in English for the first time.
1340		China	A "watermelon bomb" containing miniature rockets known as "ground rats" is employed by Liu Bowen against rebels and pirates in Zhejiang.
1344		West	Wooden cannons appear in Europe.
1346	26 August	West	Battle of Crécy: Organ guns are used.
1346		West	The term "bombard" is used to refer to guns of any kind.
1350		China	Cast iron technology becomes reliable enough to make one-piece iron cannons in China.
1350		China	Flint and wheel mechanisms are employed in igniting land mines and naval mines in China.
1350		China	In China organ guns appear.
1350		China	Two wheeled gun carriages appear in China.
1350		India	India acquires rockets.
1352		Southeast Asia	Cannons are mentioned to have been used by the Ayutthaya Kingdom in their invasion of the Khmer Empire
1358		China	Defending garrisons fire cannons en masse at the siege of Shaoxing and defeat a Ming army.
1360		Middle East	In the middle east metal-barrel guns start appearing in textual sources.
1360		Southeast Asia	Gunpowder barrels aboard a Khmer ship explode.
1363	30 August – 4 October	China	Battle of Lake Poyang: Cannons are used in ship combat and a new weapon called the "No Alternative" also appears. It consists of a reed mat bundled together with gunpowder and iron pellets hung on a pole from the foremast of a ship. When an enemy ship is within range, the fuse is lit, and the bundle falls onto the enemy ship spitting iron pellets and burning their men and sails.
1364		West	Breech loading cannons start appearing in Europe.
1366		China	Two thousand four hundred large and small cannons are deployed by the Ming army at the siege of Suzhou.
1366		India	The Vijayanagara Empire acquires firearms.
1368		China	Crouching-tiger cannons are employed by the Ming army.
1370		China	Gunpowder is corned to strengthen the explosive power of land mines in the Ming dynasty.
1370		China	Cannon projectiles transition from stone to iron ammunition in the Ming dynasty.
1372		China	Cannons made specifically for naval usage appear in the Ming dynasty.
1373		West	The term "hand gun", also known as handgonne, gunnies, vasam scolpi, pot, capita, and testes, appears in European texts for the first time.
1374		Sinosphere	Goryeo starts producing gunpowder.
1374		West	Cannons breach a city wall for the first time in Europe.
1375		West	"Basilisk" cannons appear.
1375		West	A 900 kg large-calibre gun is produced in Europe.
1375		Worldwide	Flash pans are added to hand cannons.
1375		West	European gunsmiths begin testing barrels for structural integrity, improving quality.
1377		Sinosphere	Goryeo starts producing cannons and rockets.
1380		China	"Wasp nest" rocket launchers are manufactured for the Ming army.
1380	24 June	West	Battle of Chioggia: In Europe rockets are used in battle.
1380		West	Europeans develop the means to produce saltpeter for themselves.
1382		West	European sailing ships are equipped with cannons.
1382	3 May	West	Battle of Beverhoutsveld: The first military conflict in Europe where cannons play a decisive role.
1388		China	Ming–Mong Mao War: Volley fire is implemented with cannons by the Ming artillery corps in the anti-insurrection war waged against the Mong Mao.
1388		West	Saltpeter plantations start appearing in Europe.
1390		Southeast Asia	Đại Việt soldiers kill the king of Champa, Che Bong Nga, using hand cannons.
1396		West	In Europe mounted knights start employing fire lances.
1398	17 December	India	Delhi Sultanate uses bombs against Tamerlane.
1399		West	Germany's oldest extant firearm is dated to this year.

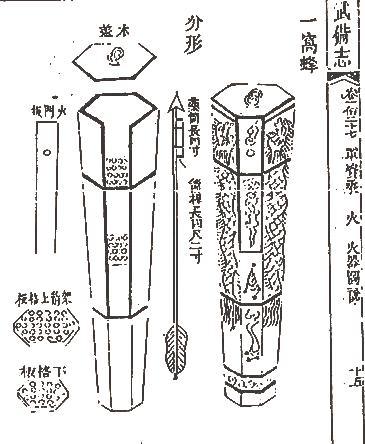
A "nest of bees" (yi wo feng 一窩蜂) arrow rocket launcher as depicted in the Wubei Zhi.

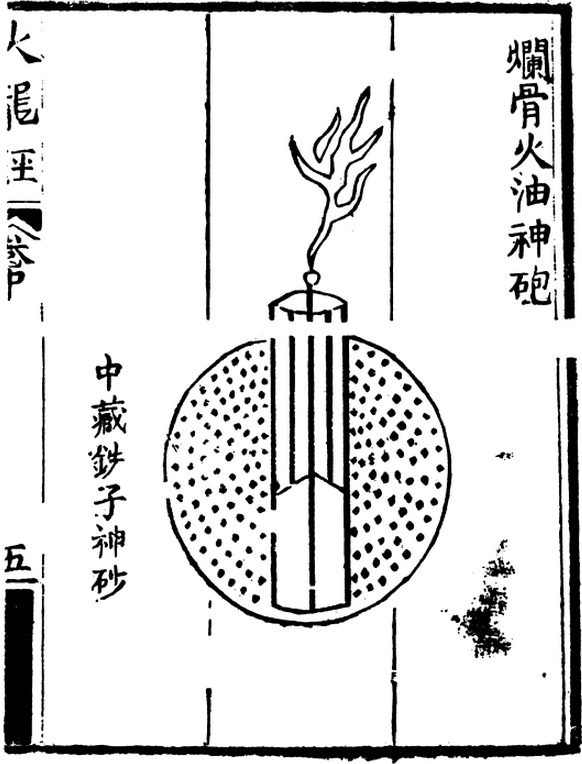
A 'divine bone dissolving fire oil bomb' (lan gu huo you shen pao) from the Huolongjing.

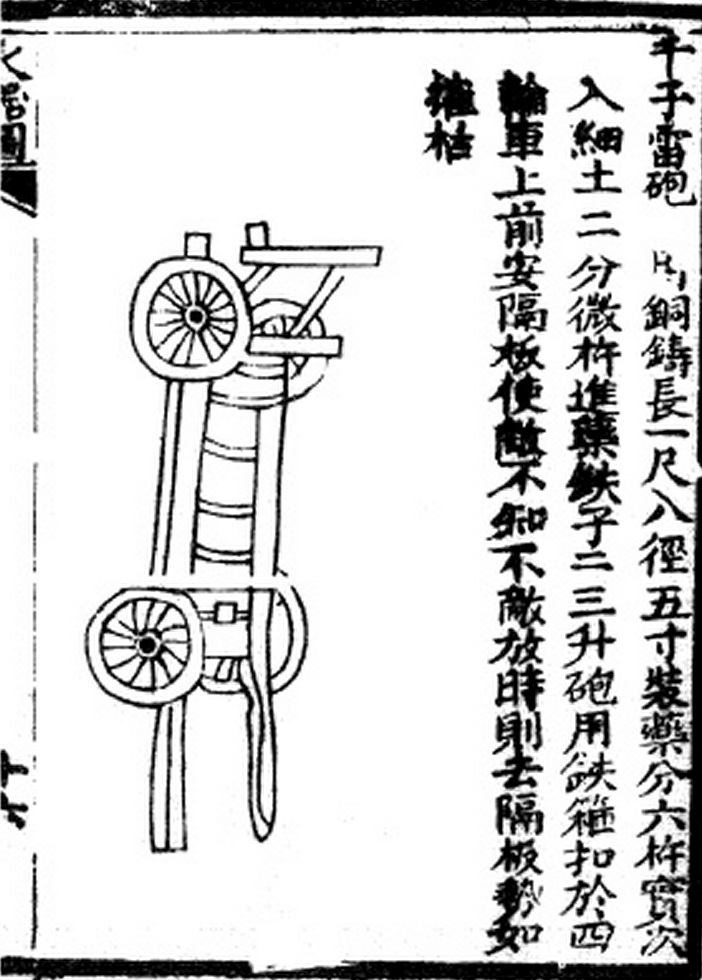
A bronze "thousand ball thunder cannon" from the Huolongjing.

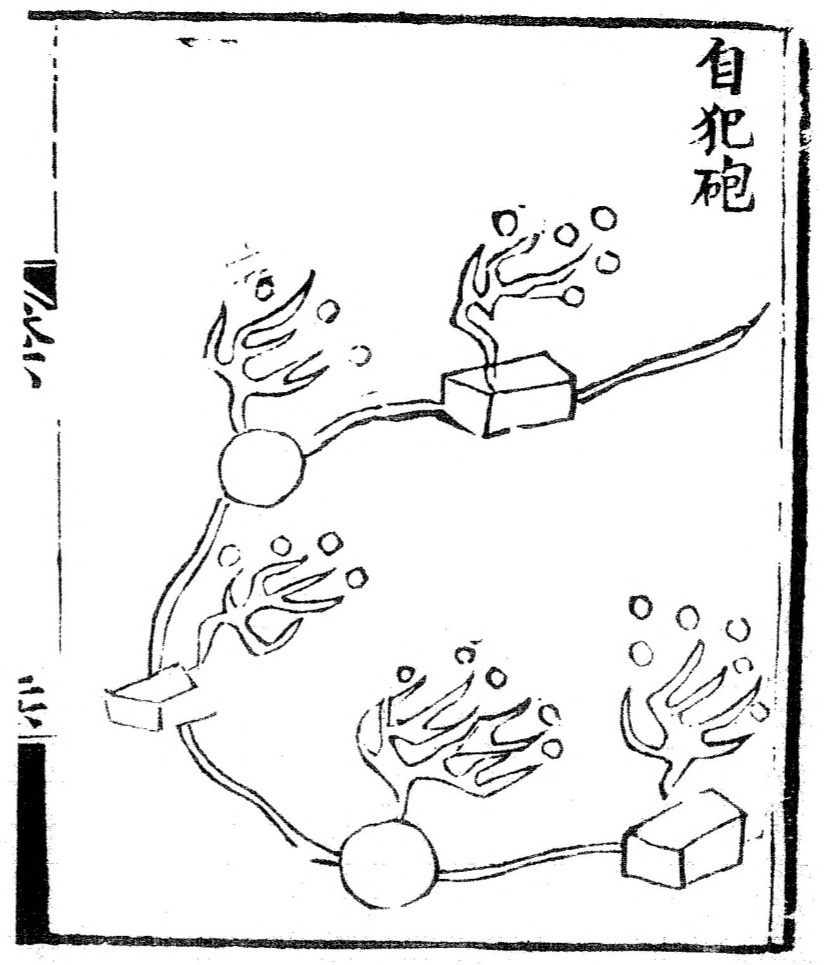
The 'self-tripped trespass land mine' (zi fan pao) from the Huolongjing.

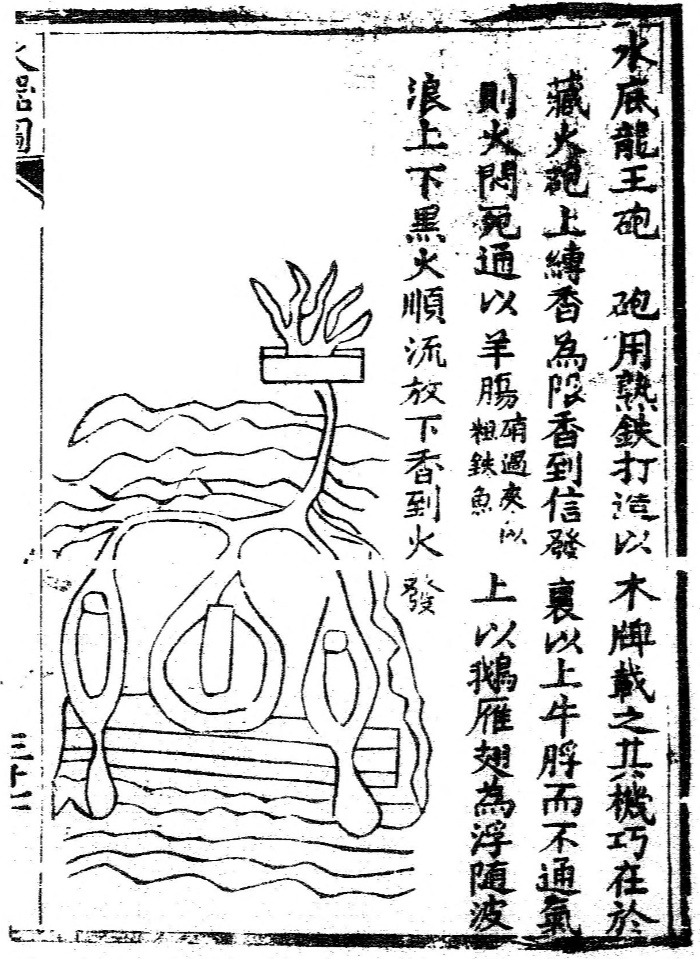
Naval mine system known as the 'marine dragon-king' (shui di long wang pao) from the Huolongjing.

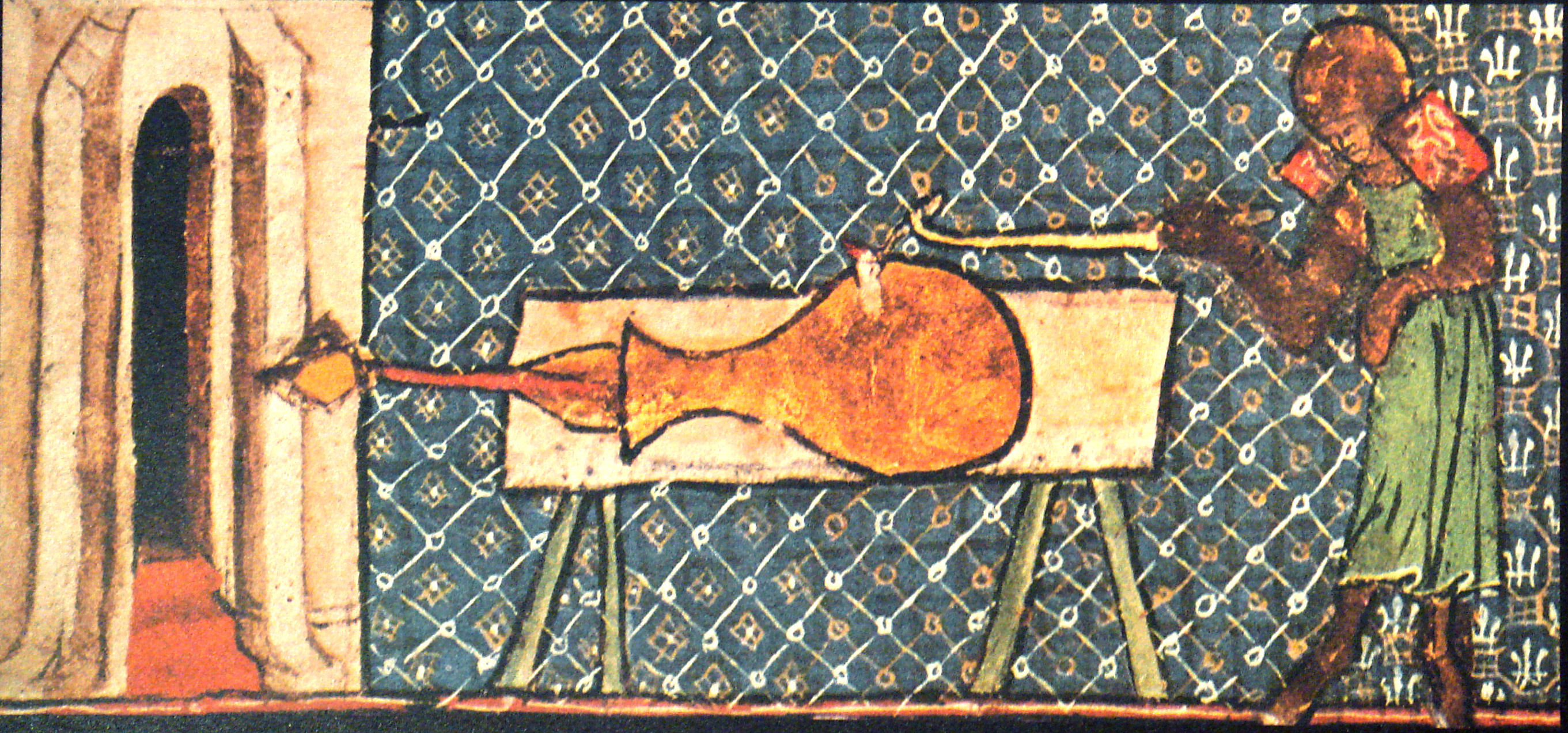
Oldest known European depiction of a firearm from De Nobilitatibus Sapientii Et Prudentiis Regum by Walter de Milemete (1326).

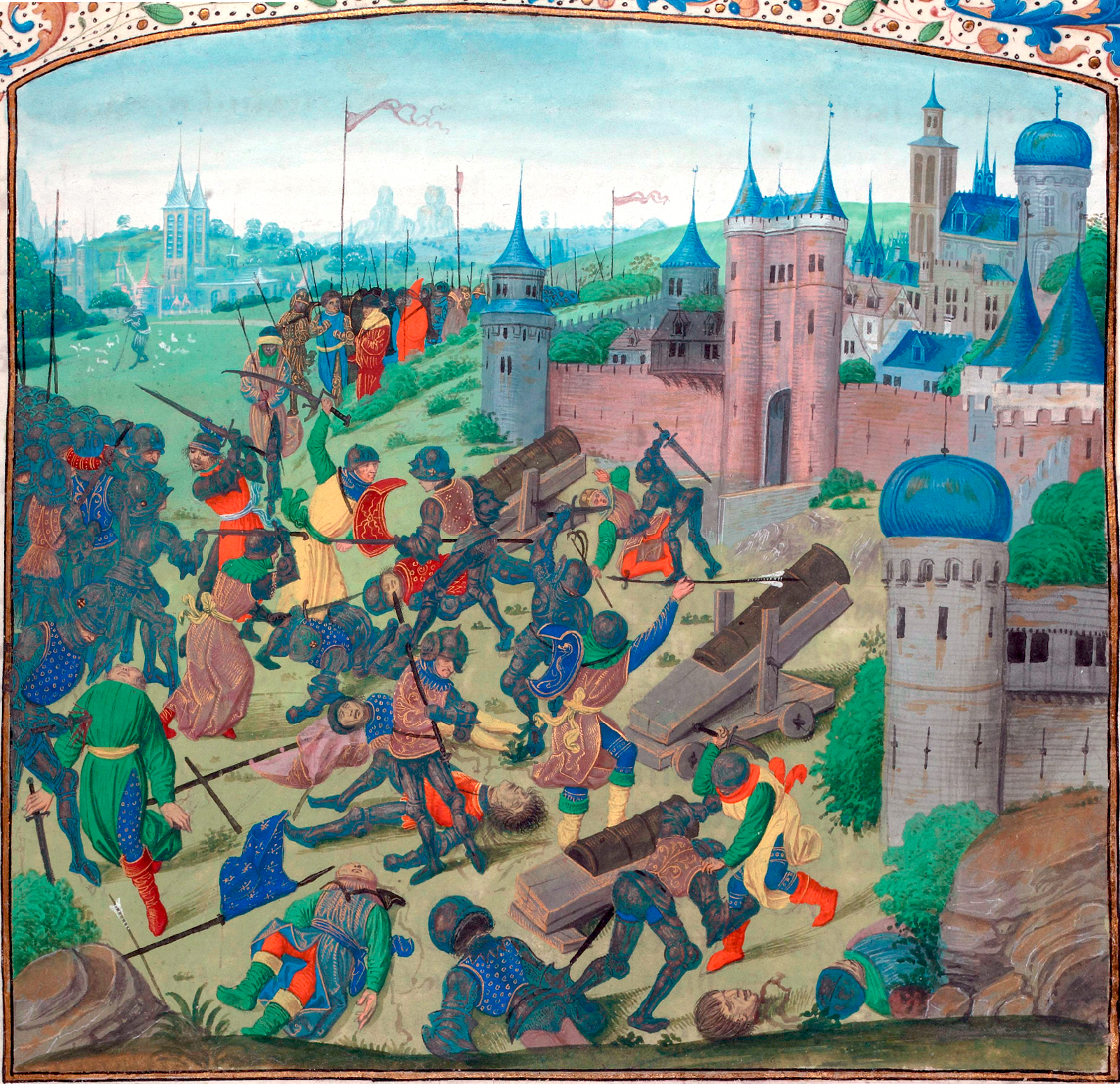
Battle of Nicopolis 1398

== 15th century ==
Major developments: Large-calibre artillery weighing several thousand kg are produced in Europe during the early 15th century and spread to the Ottoman Empire. Modifiable two wheeled gun carts known as limbers and caissons appear, greatly improving the mobility of artillery. The matchlock arquebus, the first firearm with a trigger mechanism, appears in Europe by 1475. Rifled barrels also appear in the late 15th century. The term musket is used for the first time in 1499. Rocket launchers are used in battle by the Ming dynasty and the Korean kingdom of Joseon develops a mobile rocket launcher vehicle called the hwacha. Chinese style bombs are used in Japan by 1468 at the latest.

Year	Date	Region	Event
1400		West	In Europe the gunpowder slow match appears.
1400		China	Li Jinglong uses rocket launchers against the army of the Yongle Emperor.
1400		West	Springalds are entirely replaced by gunpowder weapons
1405		West	Europe acquires bombs.
1407		China	Ironwood wadding is added to Ming cannons, increasing their effectiveness.
1409		Sinosphere	Battle carts armed with cannons firing iron fletched darts are produced in Joseon.
1410		Sinosphere	Joseon ships are equipped with cannons.
1410		West	"Culverins" are mentioned for the first time.
1410		West	"Saker" cannons appear.
1411		West	A "serpentine" lever is added to the stocks of hand cannons in Europe to hold matches. The resulting firearm, the hook gun, becomes known as the arquebus.
1412		China	Shells are used as ammunition in the Ming dynasty.
1413		Sinosphere	Joseon mortars capable of firing 500 meter iron shots and 600 meter stone shots are mentioned.
1413		Southeast Asia	The customs of firing cannons and pole gun is mentioned as part of Javanese marriage ceremony.
1415		Sinosphere	10,000 guns are deployed throughout Joseon
1419		China	During the Lantern Festival, the Ming imperial palace puts on a display of pyrotechnics involving rockets running along wires which light up lanterns, illuminating the palace.
1420		West	In Europe war wagons are used as mobile firearm platforms during the Hussite Wars.
1420		Sinosphere	Iron shot replaces stone as the standard ammunition in Joseon
1421		Southeast Asia	A Chinese pole cannon found in Java is dated from this year, bearing the name of Yongle Emperor.
1425		West	In Europe gunpowder corning is practiced.
1429		China	Mounted infantry carrying hand cannons are employed by the Ming army.
1431		West	A 12,000 kg wrought iron large-calibre gun capable of firing 300 kg projectiles, called Dulle Griet, is produced in Europe.
1431		West	European cannon projectiles transition from stone to iron ammunition.
1437		West	In Europe shells are used as ammunition.
1437		West	A master gunner in Europe is forced to make a pilgrimage to Rome after scaring his fellow soldiers, who accused him of satanic devilry, with an astounding rate of fire of three rounds in one day.
1447		Sinosphere	Sejong the Great of Joseon decrees that all fire-squads should carry standardized firearms.
1450		West	European walls become lower and thicker in response to cannons.
1450		West	Trunnions appear in Europe.
1450	15 April	West	Battle of Formigny: Marks the rapid decline of the English longbow as they prove to be inferior to cannons in both range and rate of fire.
1451		Sinosphere	A type of multiple arrow rocket launcher known as the "Munjong Hwacha" is produced in Joseon.
1453		West	Modifiable two wheeled gun carts known as limbers appear, greatly improving cannon maneuverability and mobility.
1456		India	Malwa Sultanate uses cannons as siege weapons to demolish ramparts: In India cannons become widespread.
1460	3 August	West	James II of Scotland is killed by one of his own guns, which exploded while he was standing close to it.
1460		West	"Mortars" are mentioned for the first time.
1464		Middle East	A 16,800 kg cast bronze large-calibre gun known as the Great Turkish Bombard is created in the Ottoman Empire.
1468		Sinosphere	A Chinese "thunderbomb" made of paper and bamboo wrapping two pounds of gunpowder and iron filings is mentioned to have been in use in Japan; Chinese style bombs are used as trebuchet shots until at least 1500
1470		West	A shoulder stock is added to hand cannons in Europe.
1471		Southeast Asia	Cham–Annamese War: Lê dynasty troops use cannons to blast a breach in Vijaya's fortifications prior to capturing the city
1472		India	In India land mines appear; Bahmani Sultanate utilizes them in siege warfare.
1475		West	The matchlock mechanism is added to the arquebus, making it the first firearm with a trigger.
1479		West	A four layer artillery tower is built at Querfurth in Saxony.
1480		West	Guns reach their classic form in Europe.
1480		West	"Falconets" are mentioned for the first time.
1480		West	"Minion" cannons appear.
1486		West	European oar ships start carrying cannons.
1488		West	Henry VII of England's ships, the Regent and Sovereign, are among the first to carry enough cannons to deliver a 'ship killing' blow at a distance.
1498		West	Specialized hunting firearms with rifled barrels appear in Europe.
1499	25 August	West	Battle of Zonchio: Breech-loading iron cannons are used in naval warfare.
1499		West	The term musket or moschetto is used for the first time in Europe.

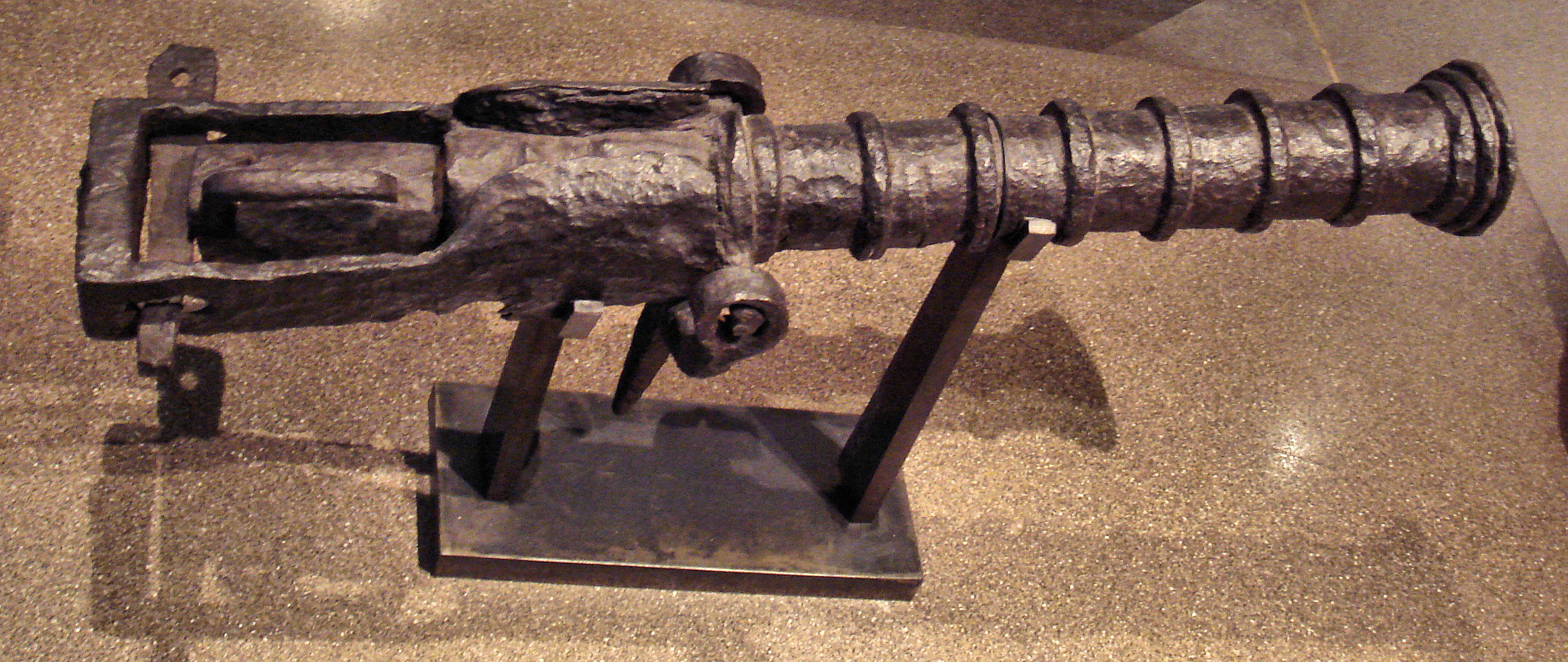
Breech loading cannon, 1410.

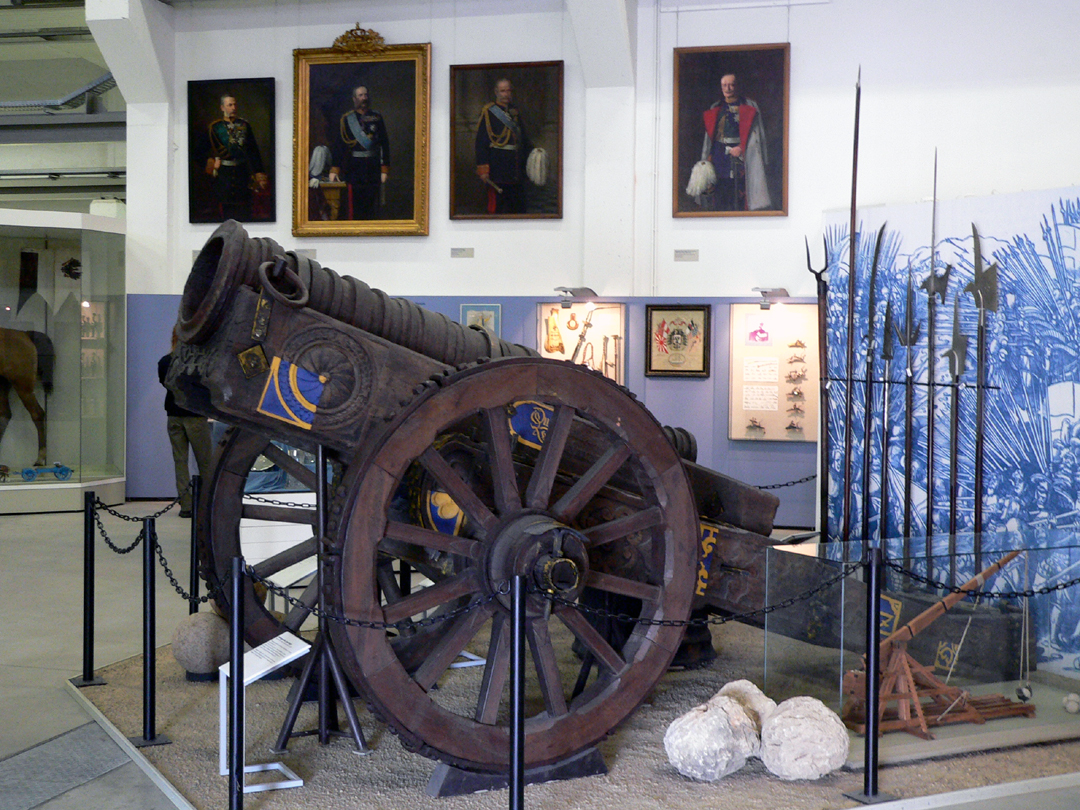
Faule Magd ("Lazy Maid"), a medieval cannon from ca. 1410–1430.

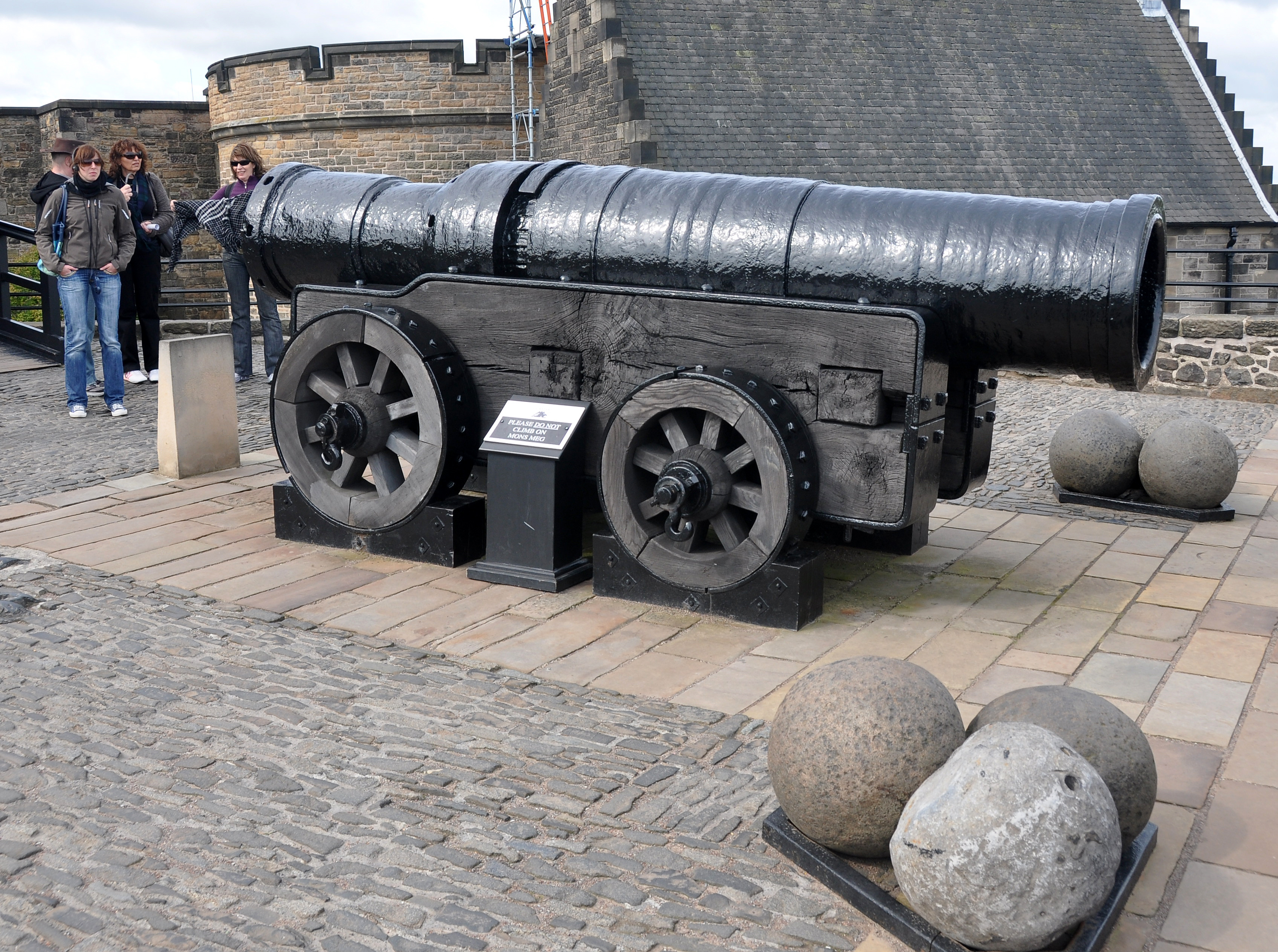
Mons Meg, a medieval Bombard (weapon) built in 1449.

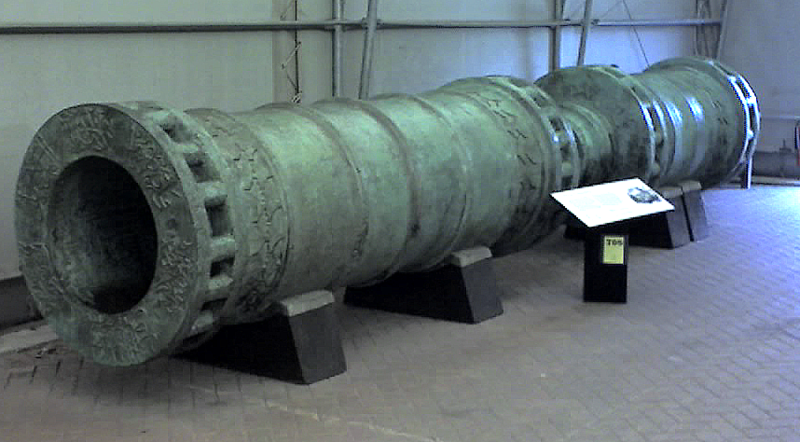
The bronze Great Turkish Bombard, used by the Ottoman Empire in the siege of Constantinople in 1453.

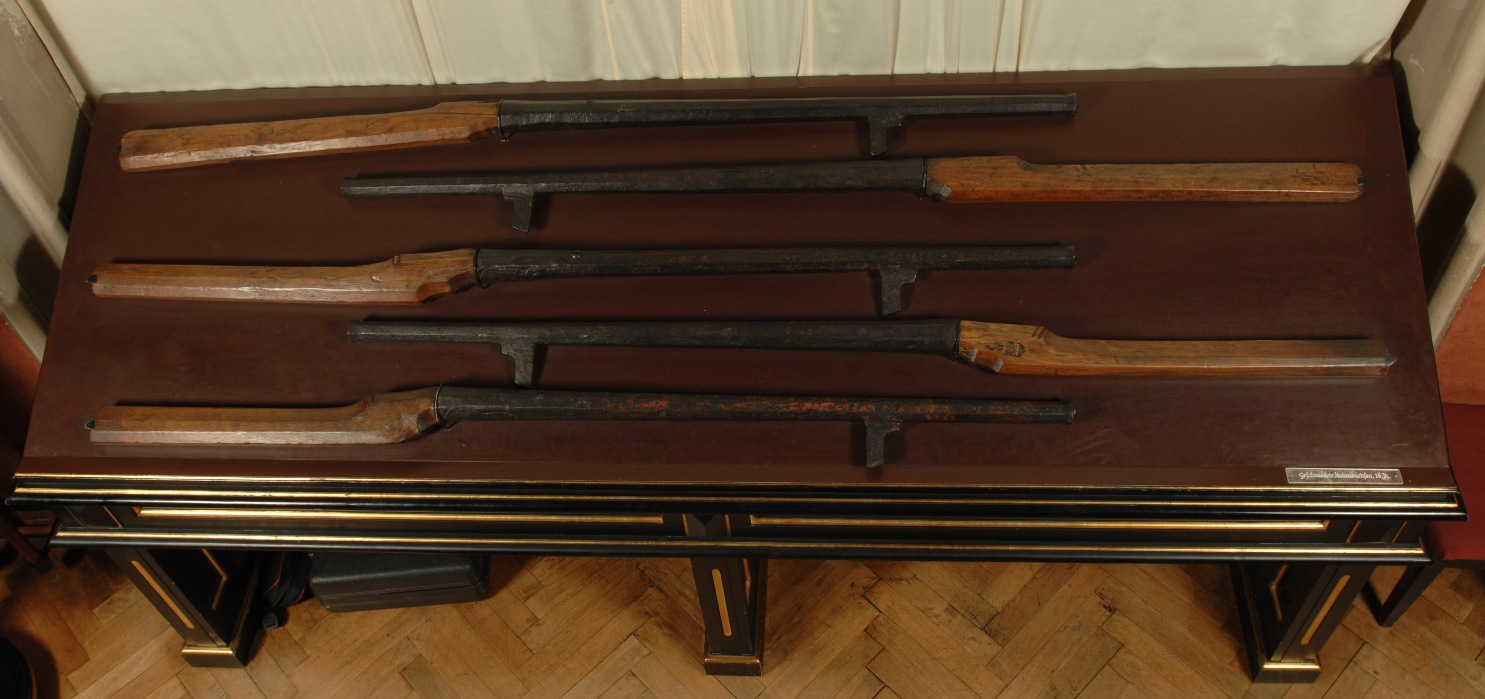
Early arquebuses prior to the matchlock were just hand cannons with a hook

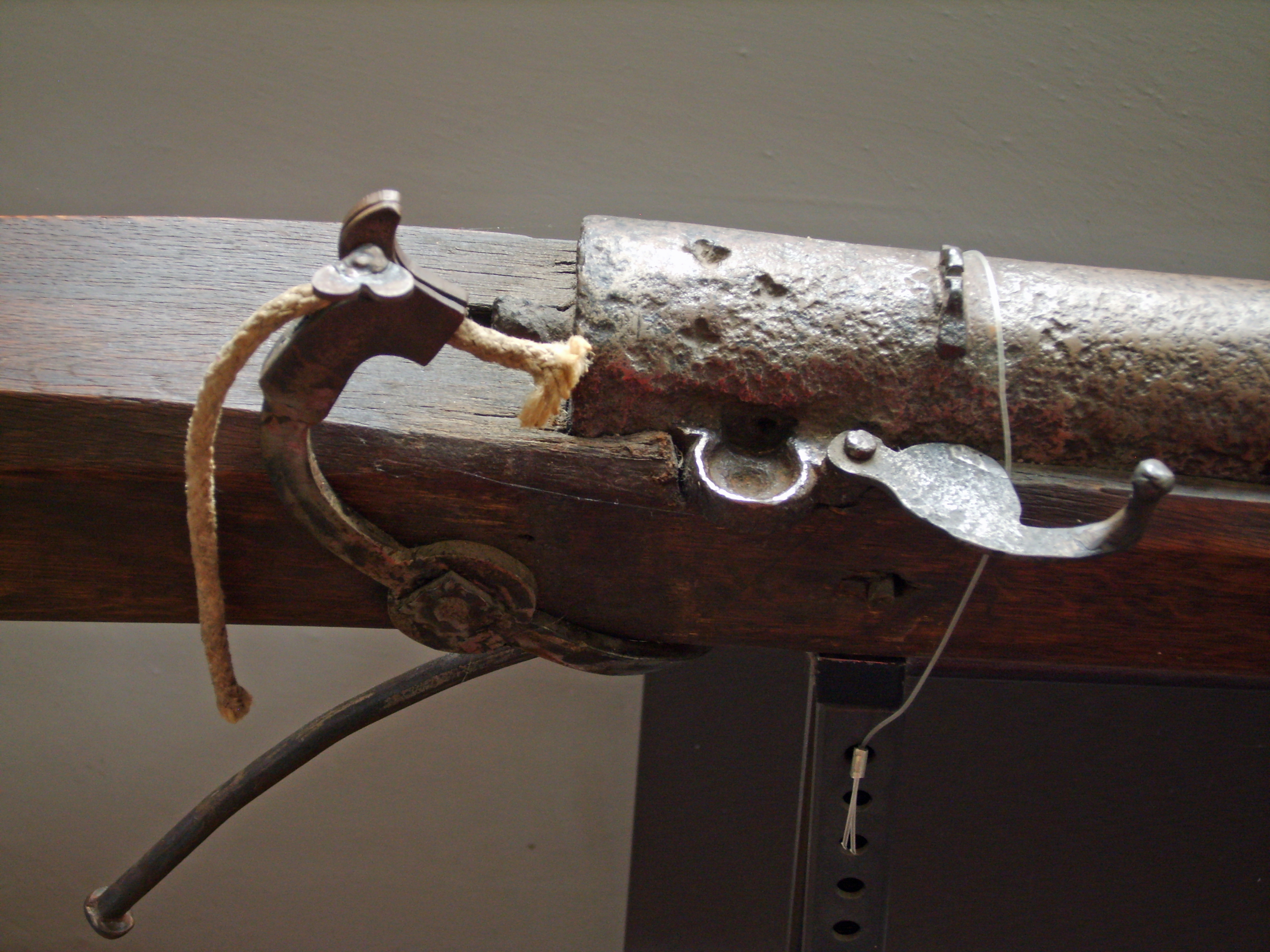
A serpentine matchlock mechanism

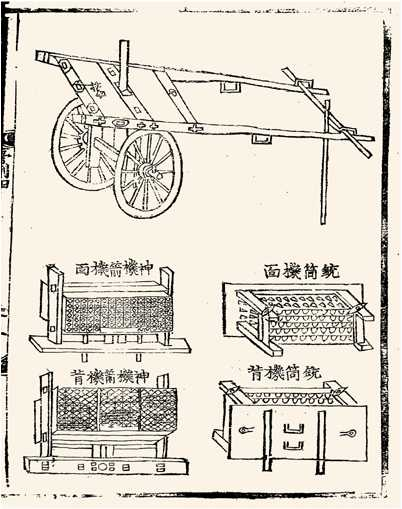
A hwacha assembly and disassembly illustration from the Gukjo Orye Seorye, 1474

== 16th century ==
Major developments: Matchlock firearms spread throughout Eurasia, reaching China and Japan by the mid-16th century. The volley fire technique is implemented using matchlock firearms by the Ottomans, Ming dynasty, and Dutch Republic by the end of the century. The arquebus is replaced by its heavier variant called the musket to combat heavily armoured troops. "Musket" becomes the dominant term for all shoulder arms fireweapons until the mid-19th century. The wheellock and flintlock trigger mechanisms are invented. Pistols and revolvers both appear during this period. Ottoman troops attach bayonets to their firearms. Both Europe and China develop handheld breech loading firearms. The star fort spreads across Europe in response to increasing effectiveness of siege artillery. The Ming dynasty uses gunpowder for hydraulic engineering.

Year	Date	Region	Event
1500		India	India acquires matchlocks.
1500		West	The term "artillery" solidifies as a general term for cannons, their ammunition, support equipment, and operating personnel.
1503	28 April	West	Battle of Cerignola: Marks the first military conflict where arquebusiers played a decisive role.
1505		West	The wheellock appears in Europe as an expensive alternative to the matchlock.
1508		India	India acquires Portuguese cannons.
1508		West	The earliest extant rifles are dated to this year.
1510		Sinosphere	Japan acquires cannons.
1510		China	Portuguese "Frankish" cannons are used on Guangdong's coastline by Chinese pirates.
1515		West	A man in (Germany) accidentally shoots a prostitute in the chin with a pistol. Considered to be the earliest recorded firearm accident.
1516		Southeast Asia	Đại Việt and Lê dynasty produce matchlocks.
1521		West	A larger arquebus capable of penetrating plate armor known as the musket appears in Europe.
1523		China	The Ming dynasty produces breech-loading swivel guns based on Portuguese designs.
1526	21 April	India	Mughal Emperor Babur use firearms against Sultan Ibrahim Lodi, therefore winning the First Battle of Panipat.
1526	29 August	West	Battle of Mohács: Volley fire is implemented with matchlocks by Ottoman Janissaries.
1527		West	"Ordnance" is used to describe artillery for the first time.
1530		West	The star fort becomes the dominant type of defensive structure in Italy.
1530		West	Earliest dated "carbine" made in Augsburg.
1533		China	Composite metal cannons are produced in the Ming dynasty.
1537		West	Handheld breech-loading firearms start appearing in Europe.
1537		West	Niccolò Fontana Tartaglia applies mathematical applications to artillery trajectories in his Nova Scientia.
1540		West	Cast iron cannons in Europe become reliable enough to arm sailing ships with two full broadsides.
1540		Southeast Asia	In Southeast Asia matchlocks start seeing widespread use.
1540		West	Cavalry in Europe start abandoning the lance and adopt the wheellock pistol.
1541		China	Gunpowder is used for hydraulic engineering in the Ming dynasty.
1543		Sinosphere	Japan acquires knowledge of matchlocks.
1544	27 January	Sinosphere	In Japan Tanegashima Tokitaka employs matchlocks in the invasion of Yakushima.
1544		West	Wooden cannons are used for the last time in Europe.
1544		West	Charles V, Holy Roman Emperor attempts to standardize gun types.
1545		India	Gujarat experiments with composite metal cannons.
1545		West	Niccolò Fontana Tartaglia invents the gunner's quadrant, an instrument which calculates trajectory.
1548		China	The Ming army starts fielding matchlocks.
1550		West	The large arquebus known as the musket becomes obsolete due to lack of armor, but continues as the most widely used term for similar firearms in Europe.
1550		West	The snaphance flintlock mechanism appears in Europe.
1550		West	The 'flask trail' carriage replaces solid stock trail carriages in Europe.
1560		China	Qi Jiguang publishes his Jixiao Xinshu describing the musket volley fire technique and his experience training the Ming army in its use.
1561		China	The Ming dynasty starts producing handheld breech-loading firearms.
1563		Sinosphere	Joseon starts producing breech-loading swivel guns.
1568		West	Calivers are mentioned for the first time in Europe.
1573		West	In Europe explosive mines are implemented by Samuel Zimmermann of Augsburg.
1574		West	In Europe designs for naval mines are completed.
1575	28 June	Sinosphere	Battle of Nagashino: In Japan Oda Nobunaga's tanegashima troops employ volley fire.
1575		West	Trigger guards start appearing on European firearms.
1580		West	Revolvers appear in Europe.
1594	8 December	West	William Louis, Count of Nassau-Dillenburg describes the countermarch volley fire technique in a letter to his cousin Maurice, Prince of Orange, and starts training the Dutch army in volley fire.
1598		China	Ming cavalry experiments with firing a three-barreled matchlock before using it as a shield while they attack with a saber using their other hand.
1598		Middle East	The first mention of a bayonet occurs in the Shenqipu describing a knife attached to an Ottoman musket.
1600		Middle East	Ottoman cavalry starts carrying pistols.
1600		West	The term "howitzer" comes to refer to the weapon.

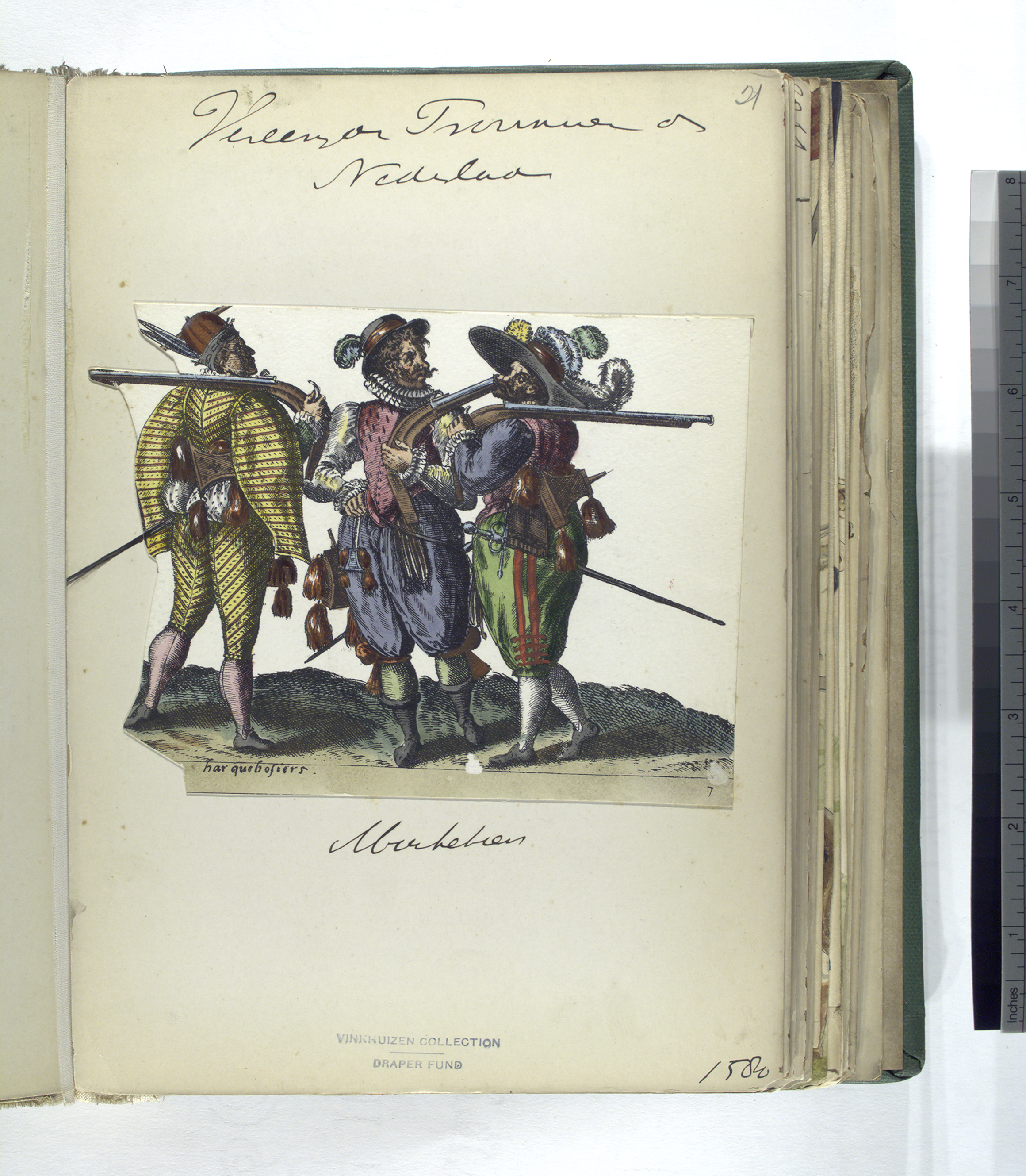
Matchlock firearms in the 16th century

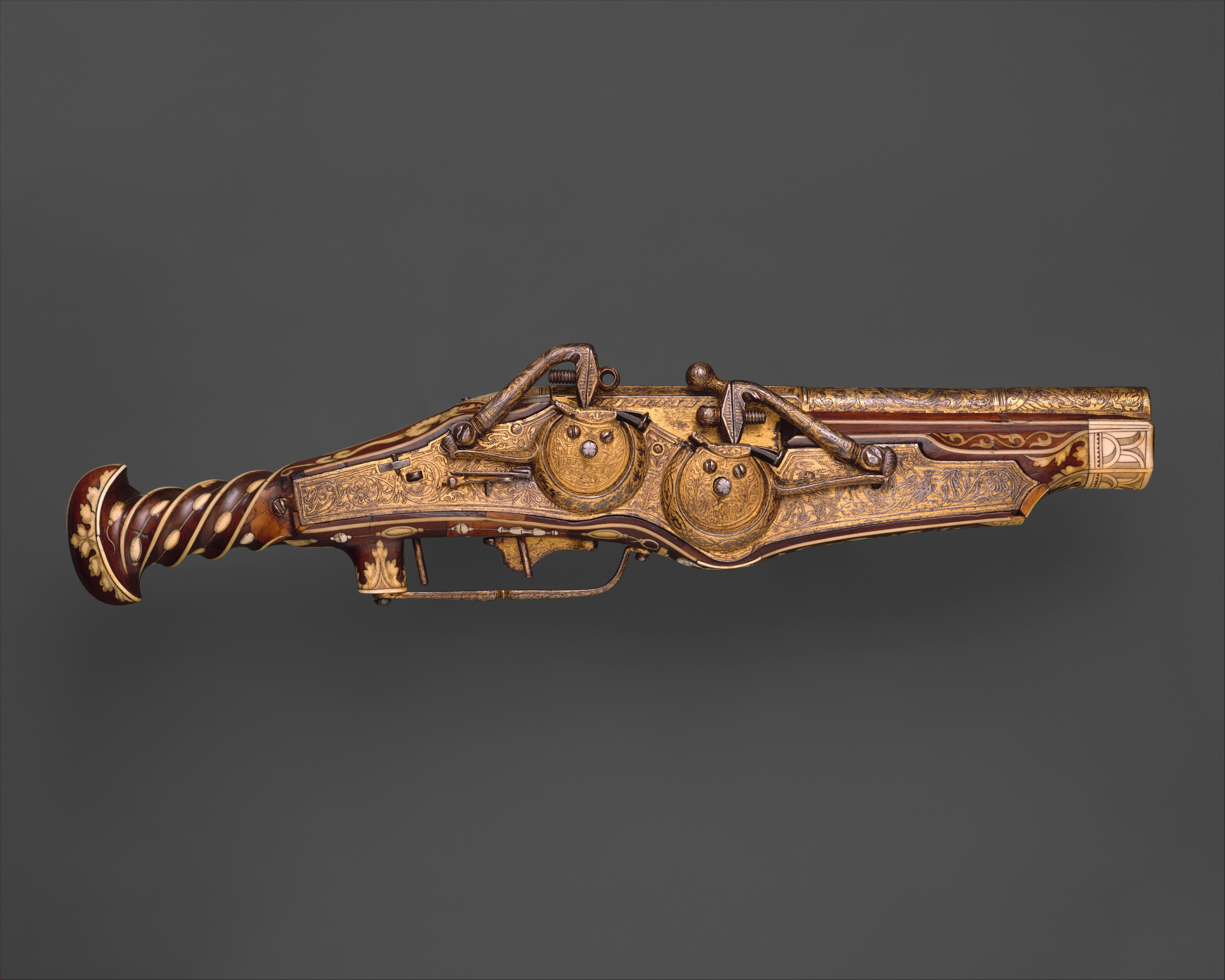
Double-Barreled Wheellock Pistol Made for Emperor Charles V, 1540

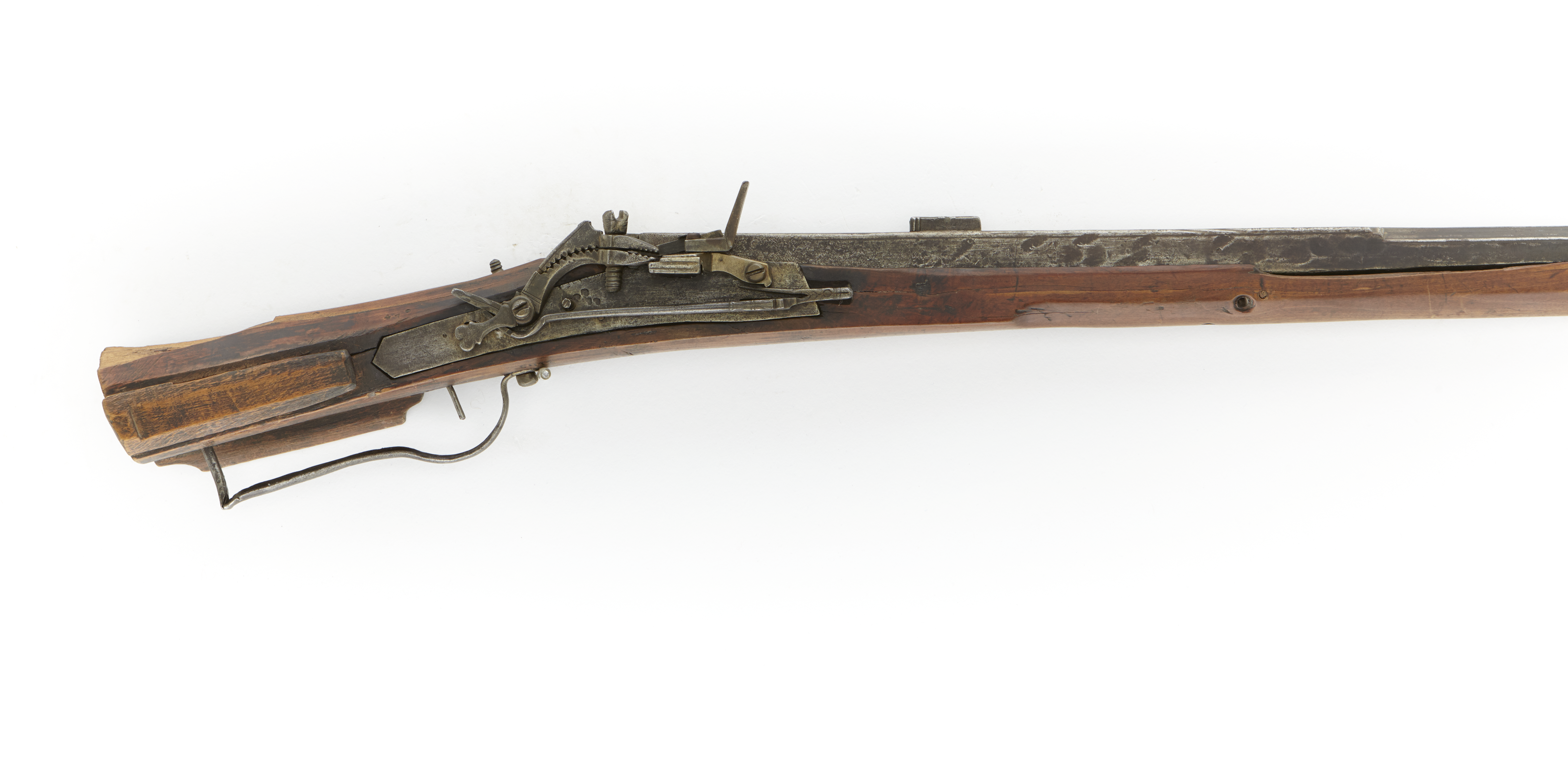
Snaphance flintlock firearm

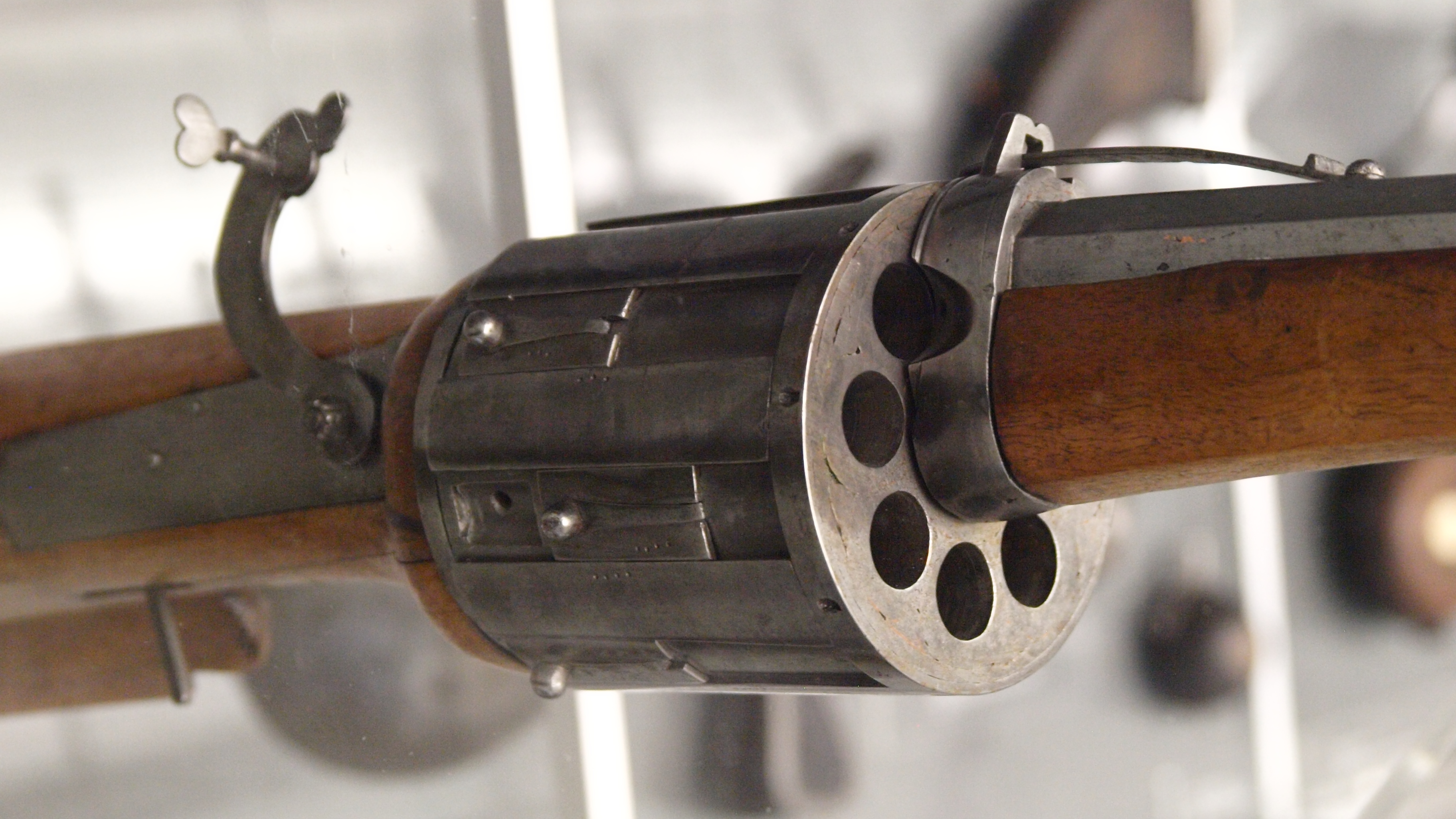
Revolver

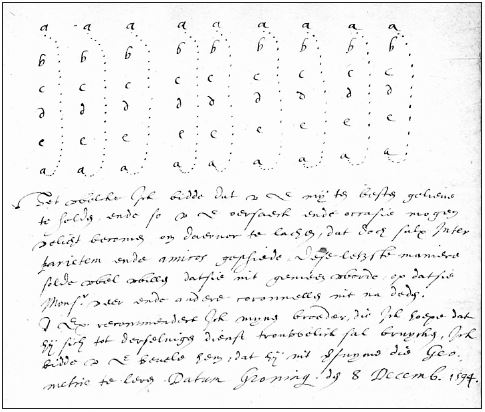
Diagram of a 1594 Dutch musketry volley formation

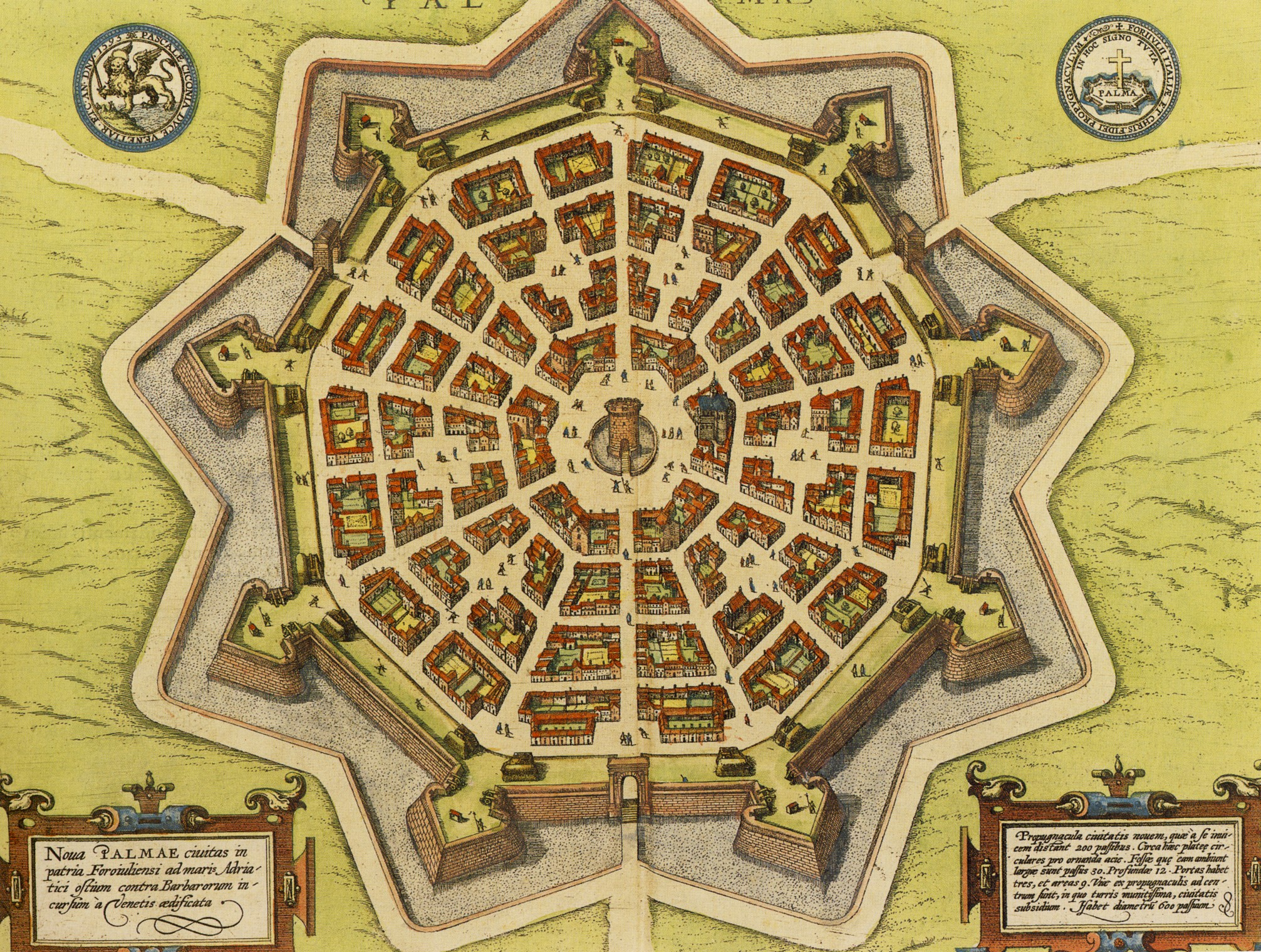
Palmanova star fort in 1593

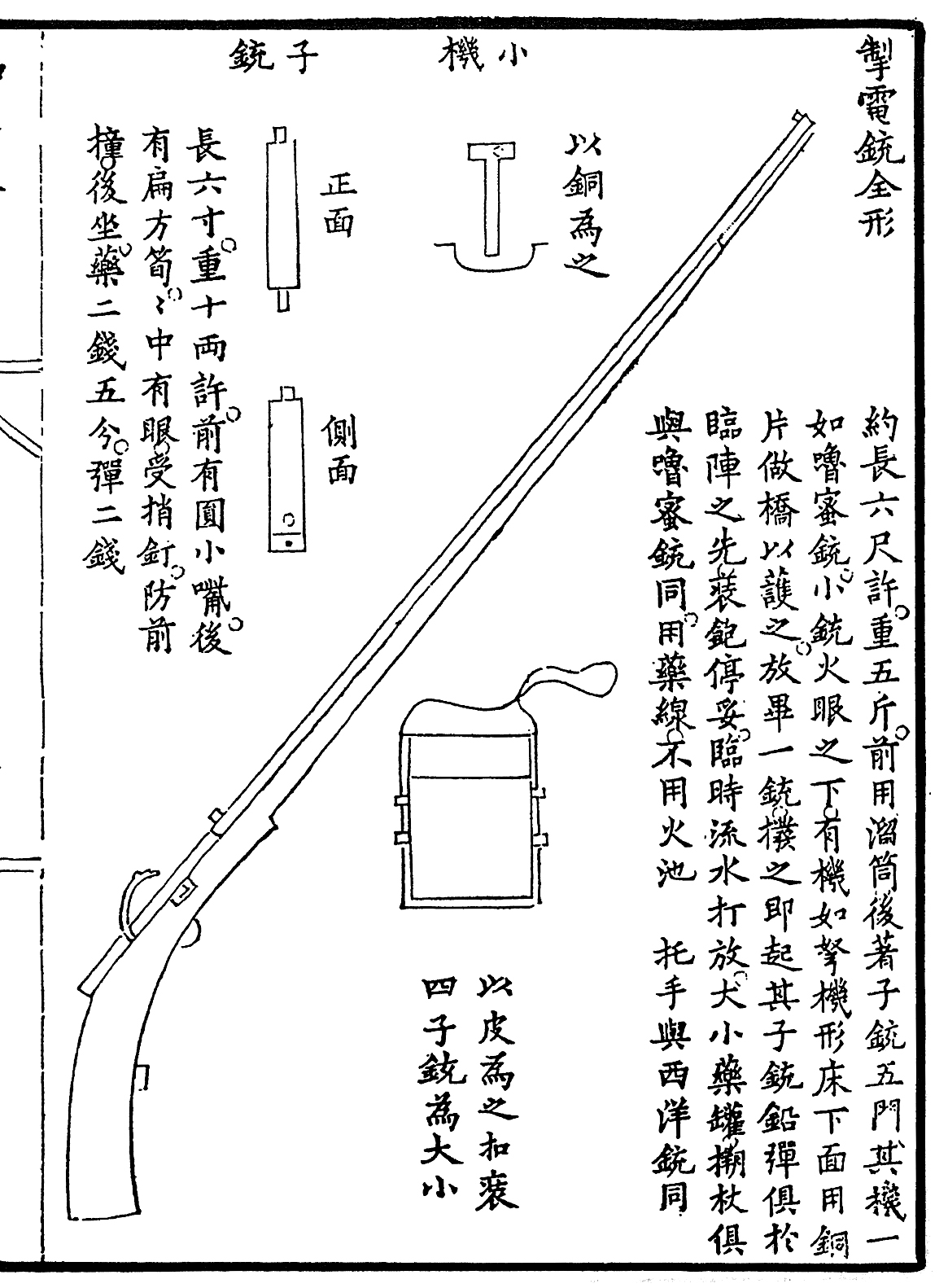
A breech loading matchlock from the Shenqipu

== 17th century ==
Major developments: Bayonets spread across Eurasia. A paper cartridge is introduced by Gustavus Adolphus. Rifles are used for war by Denmark. A ship of the line carrying 60 to 120 cannons appears in Europe. Samuel Pepys' diary mentions a machine gun like pistol. The "true" flintlock replaces the snaphance flintlock in Europe by the end of the 17th century. Both China and Japan reject the flintlock and the Mughal Empire only uses it in limited quantities. Gunpowder is used for mining in Europe.

Year	Date	Region	Event
1606		China	Ming muskets are attached with plug bayonets.
1607		Sinosphere	Joseon musketeers are trained in the volley fire technique.
1611		West	Paper cartridges are introduced by Gustavus Adolphus.
1611		West	Rifles are used in warfare by Denmark.
1613		Sinosphere	In Japan Date Masamune orders the construction of the Date Maru, a ship built in the style of a Spanish galleon, capable of carrying large cannons.
1619	14–18 April	Sinosphere	Battle of Sarhu: Later Jin cavalry defeats Ming and Joseon musketeers.
1620		China	Ming foundries start producing Hongyipao.
1627		West	Gunpowder is used for mining in Europe.
1629		West	Holland experiments with composite metal cannons.
1632		China	Ming defensive planners build some star forts but they don't catch on in China.
1633		China	Ming dockyards start construction of multidecked broadside sailing ships capable of holding large cannons under the supervision of Zheng Zhilong.
1635		China	Telescopes are used for aiming artillery in the Ming dynasty.
1636		Sinosphere	The Dutch attempt to trade flintlock firearms with the Japanese but the new firing mechanism doesn't catch on in Japan.
1637		Sinosphere	Shimabara Rebellion: In Japan the last major military engagement involving muskets, before firearm suppression policies are enacted, is conducted against an uprising of peasant-farmers and landless samurai.
1642	20 January	China	Li Zicheng's rebels manage to create a two zhang breach in Ming fortifications using cannons.
1643	26 July	West	Storming of Bristol: In Europe fire lances are used for the last time.
1650		West	Ship of the line carrying 60 to 120 cannons in broadside batteries appear in Europe.
1662	3 July	West	Samuel Pepys' diary mentions a mechanic who claimed to be able to make a machine-gun like pistol.
1671		West	European forces attach bayonets to their firearms.
1680		West	The snaphance goes out of fashion in favor of the "true" flintlock in Europe.
1694		India	India acquires flintlocks; Mughal Empire uses them in limited quantities.

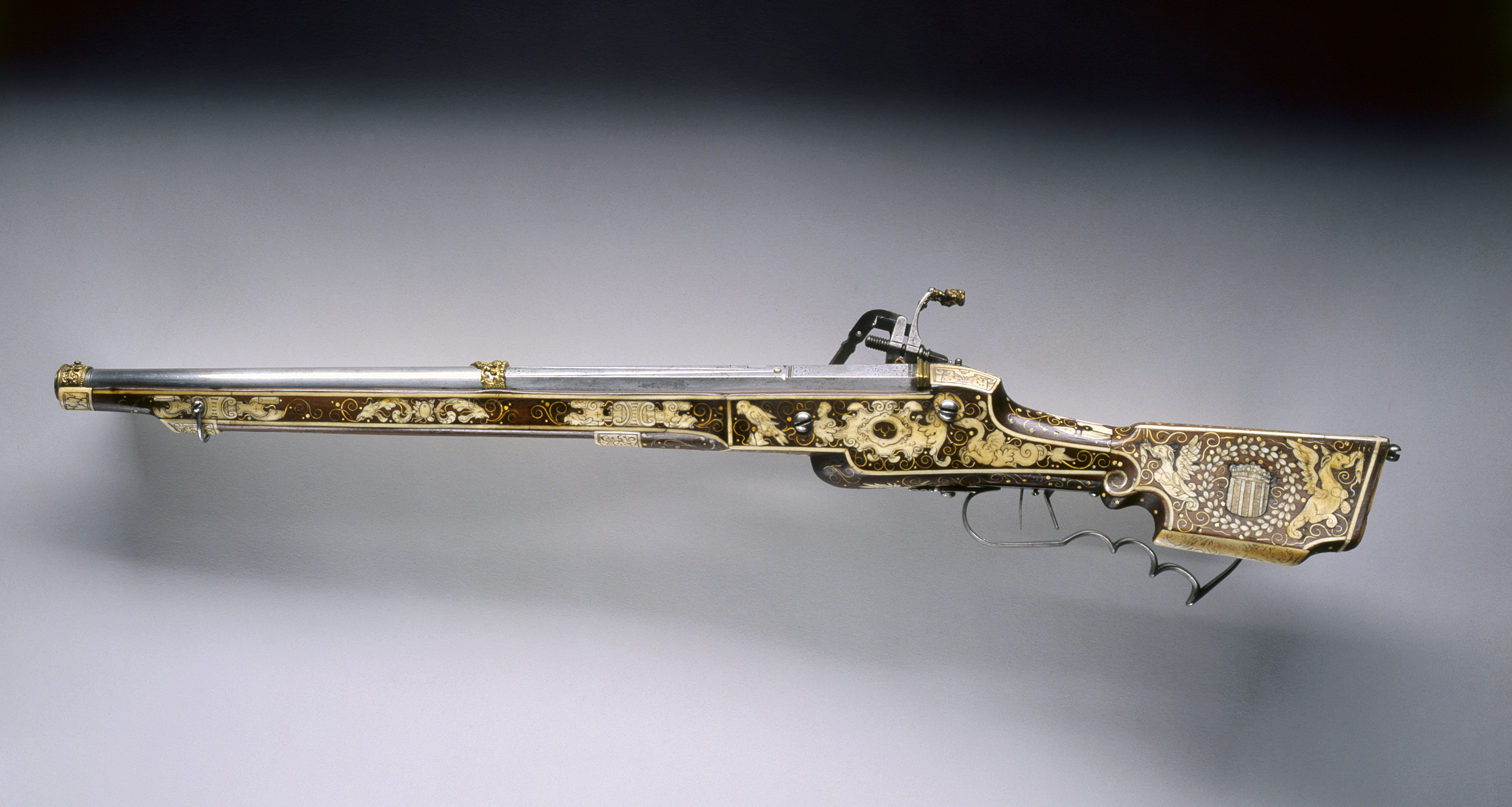
Wheellock rifle, 1618

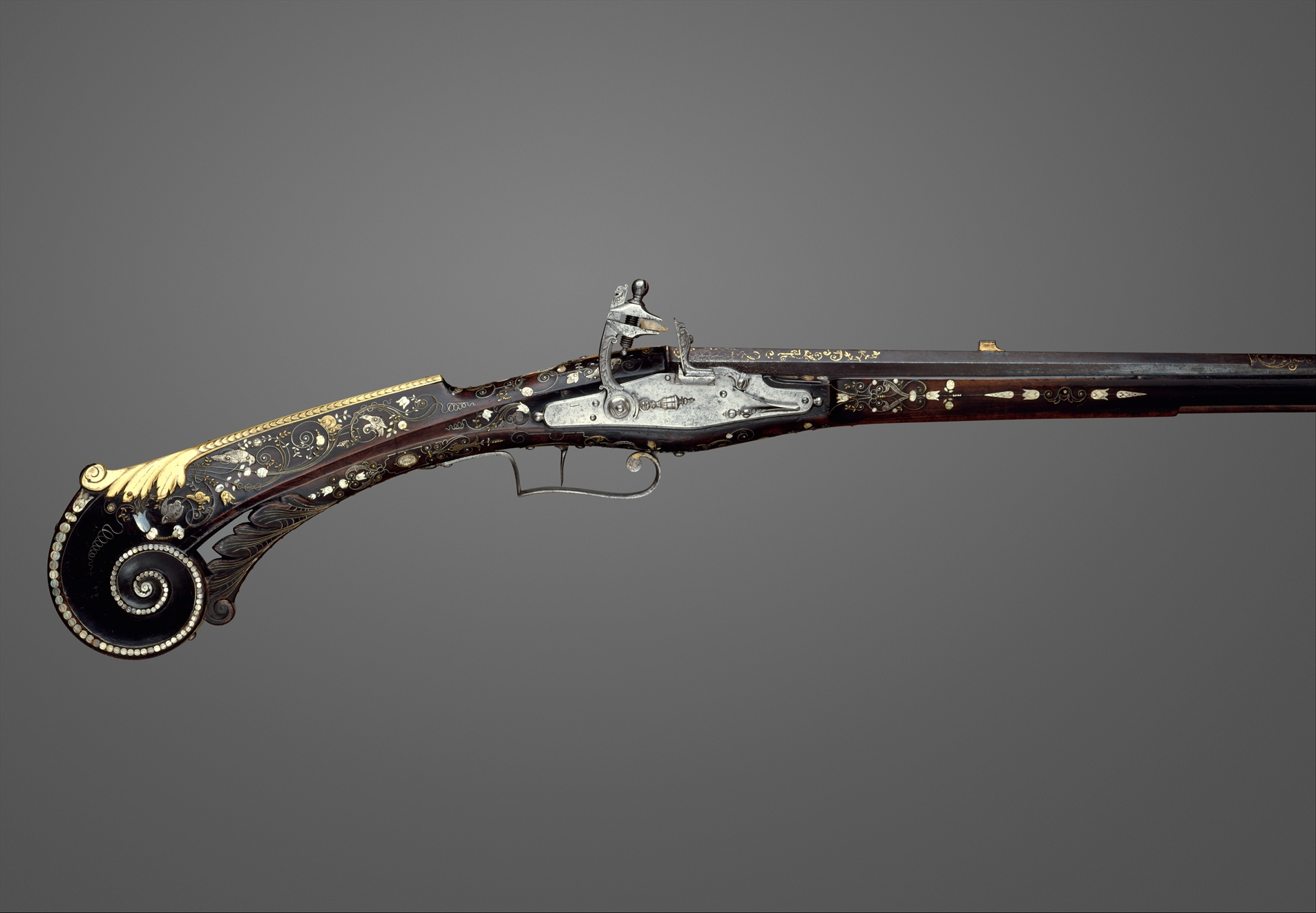
Louis XIII's flintlock, c. 1620

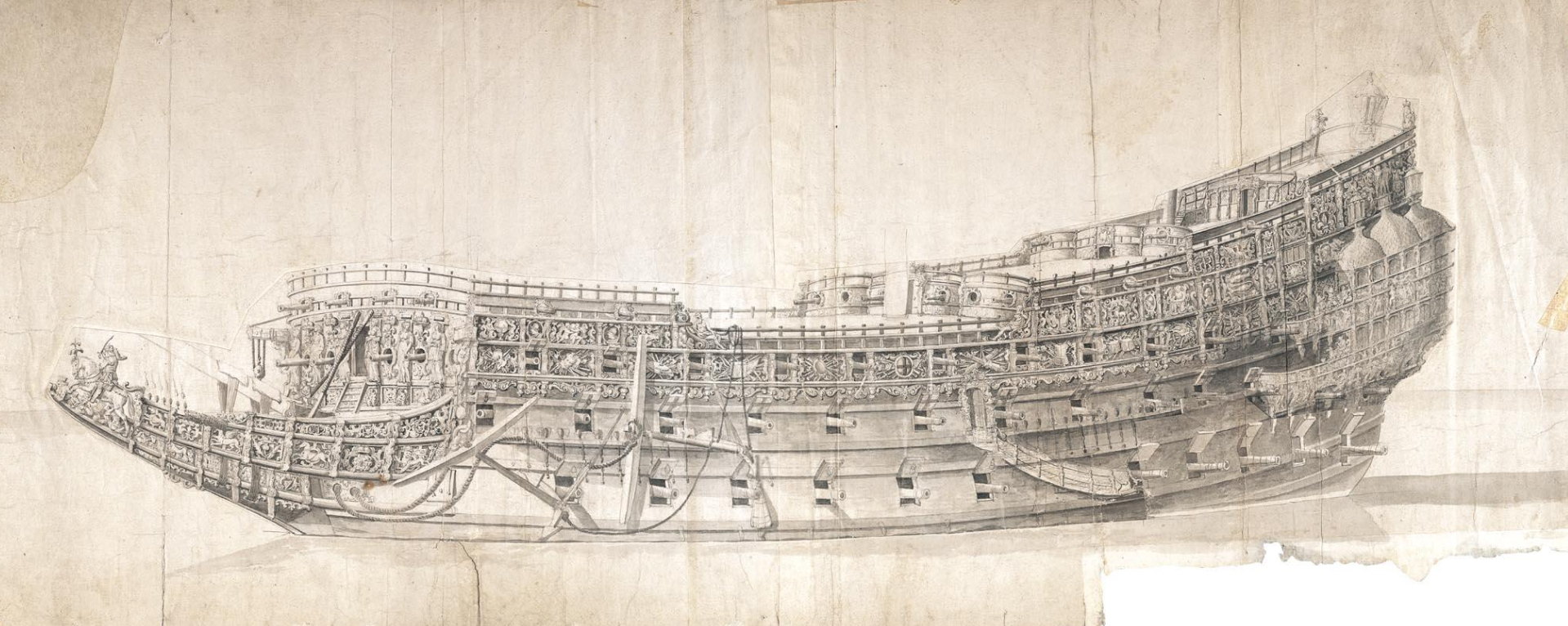
Sovereign of the Seas, 102 guns, 1637.

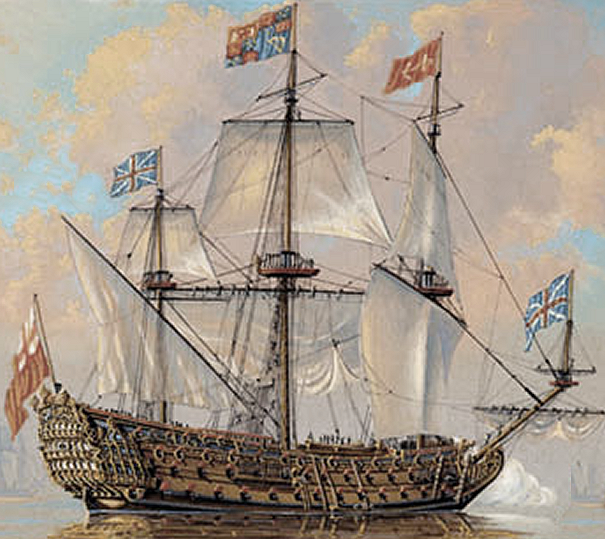
HMS Royal Charles (1673), 100 gun

HMS Britannia (1682), 100 guns

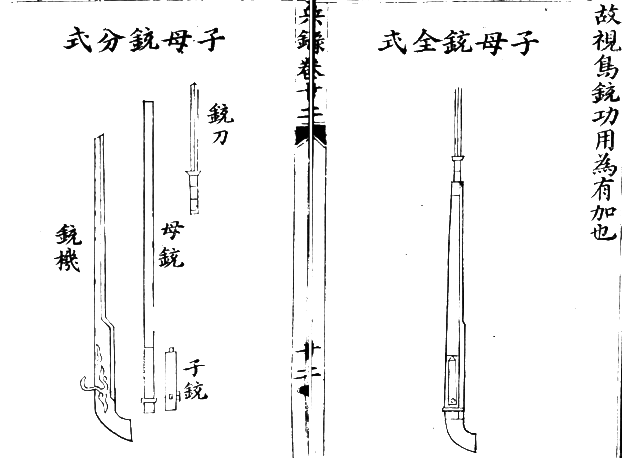
A breech loading matchlock with a plug bayonet from the Binglu, 1606.

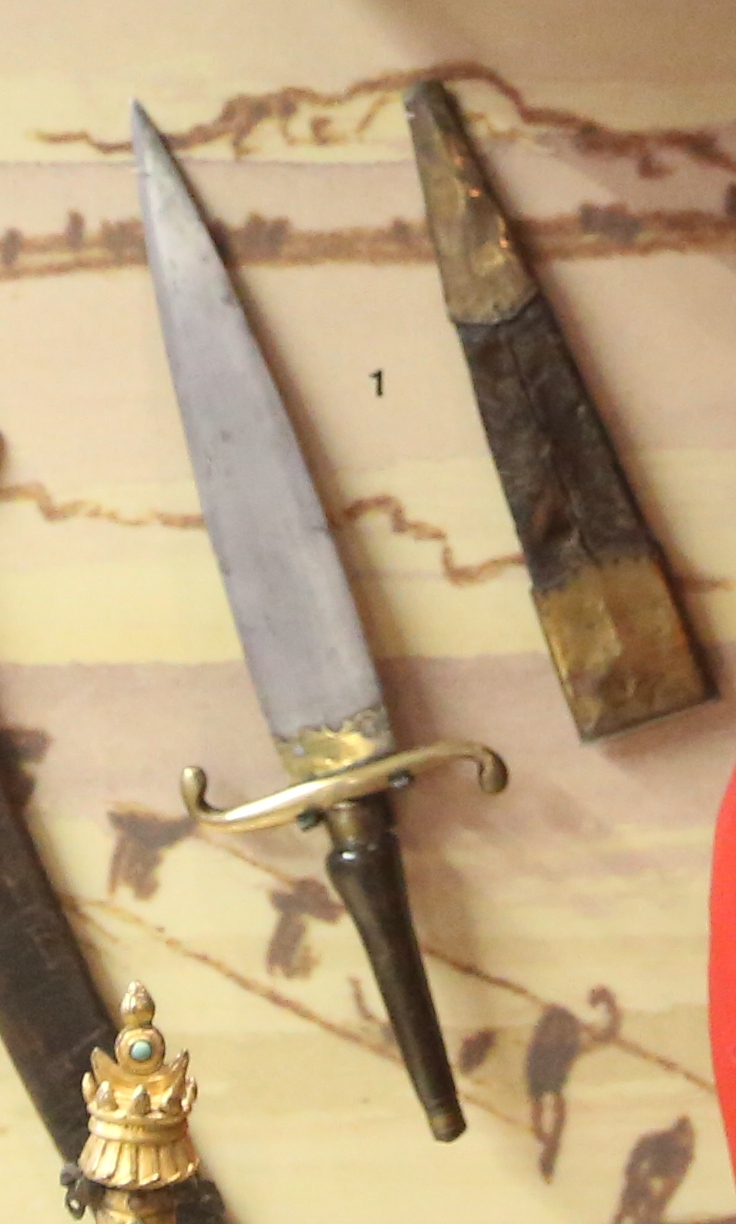
Plug bayonet from the 1650s

== 18th century ==
Major developments: Flintlocks completely displace matchlock firearms in Europe both on land and at sea. Sir William Congreve, 1st Baronet discovers "cylinder powder", gunpowder produced using charcoal in iron cylinders, which is twice as powerful as traditional gunpowder and less likely to spoil. He also invents block trail carriages, the most advanced artillery transport of the time. James Puckle invents a breechloader flintlock capable of firing 63 shots in seven minutes. The Kingdom of Mysore deploys iron cased rockets known as Mysorean rockets.

Year	Date	Region	Event
1702		West	In Europe telescopes are used to aid in the aiming of artillery.
1715		West	Jean Maritz introduces the horizontal drilling technique for casting cannons, increasing their reliability and accuracy while reducing the amount of metal needed for the barrel.
1718		West	James Puckle invents the Puckle gun, a breech loading flintlock with a revolving set of chambers capable of firing 63 shots in seven minutes.
1720		West	France establishes Europe's first national artillery school.
1725		West	Flintlock firearms completely displace matchlocks in Europe.
1742		West	Benjamin Robins invents the ballistic pendulum, which provides the first way to accurately measure the velocity of a bullet.
1750		Worldwide	Firearms overtake the composite bow in cost, ease of use, range, and rate of fire, making mounted horse archers completely obsolete.
1750		West	A detent is added to flintlocks to prevent the sear from catching in the half-cock notch.
1755		West	Naval guns are outfitted with flintlocks
1759		West	"Carronades" appear.
1770		West	A roller bearing is added to flintlocks to reduce friction and produce more sparks.
1780		West	A waterproof pan is added to flintlocks.
1783		West	Sir William Congreve, 1st Baronet improves gunpowder production by constructing dedicated testing ranges, new saltpeter refineries, and special proving houses. He also discovers "cylinder powder", gunpowder produced using charcoal sealed in iron cylinders, which is twice as powerful as traditional gunpowder and less likely to spoil, giving British gunpowder a reputation as best in the world.
1790		West	England begins fielding block trail carriages, invented by Sir William Congreve, 1st Baronet, the most advanced artillery transport of the time.
1799	22 April	India	Iron-cased Mysorean rockets are deployed by the Kingdom of Mysore against the East India Company.

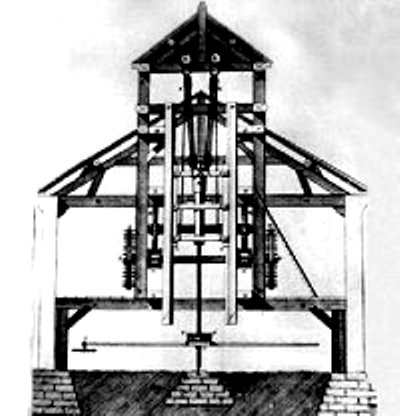
Vertical cannon drilling

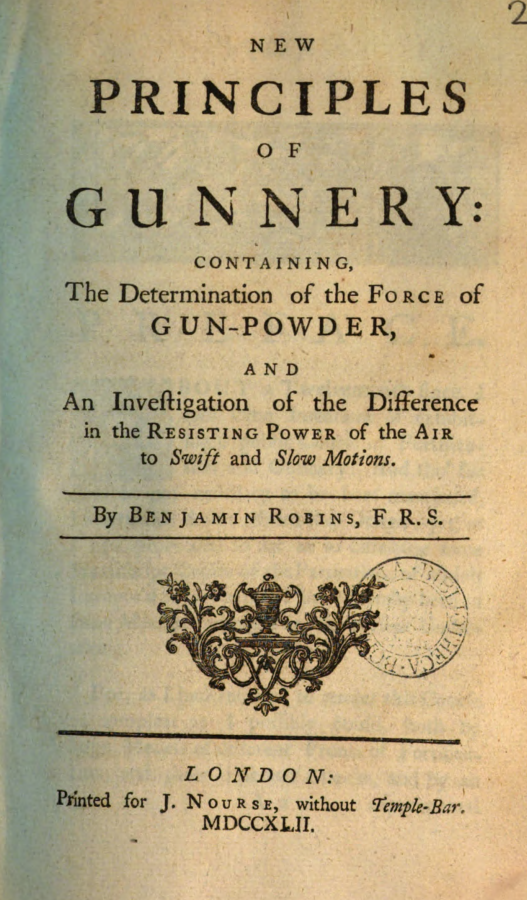
Benjamin Robins describes the ballistic pendulum in the New Principles of Gunnery

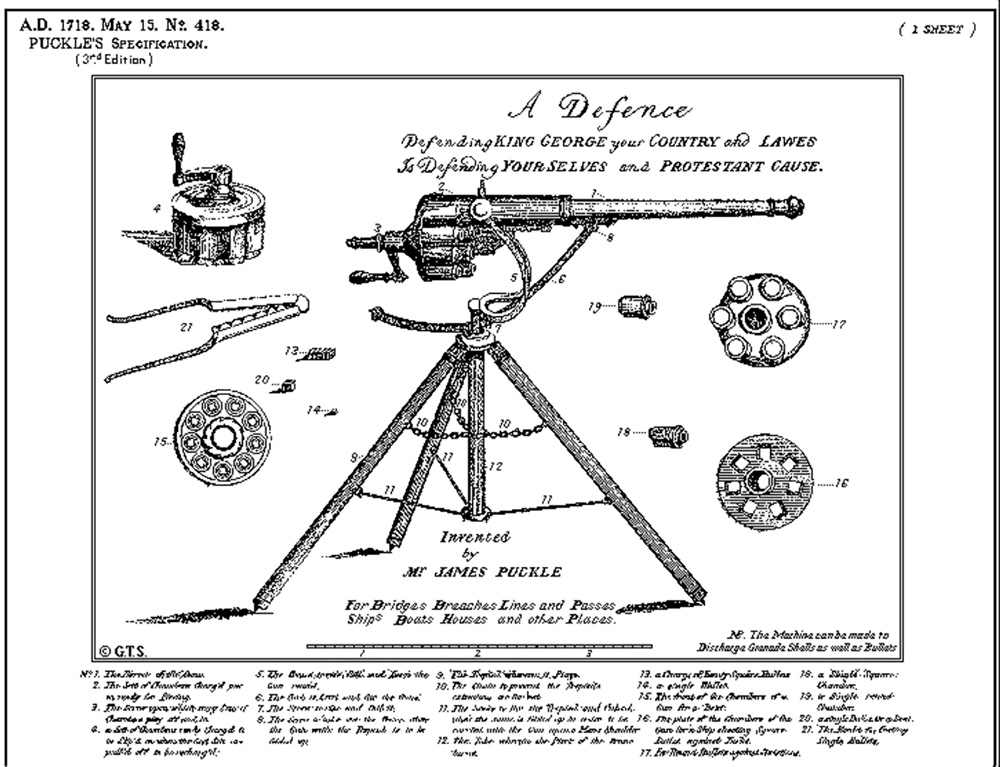
Flier for Puckle gun of 1718 showing various cylinders for use with round and square bullets.

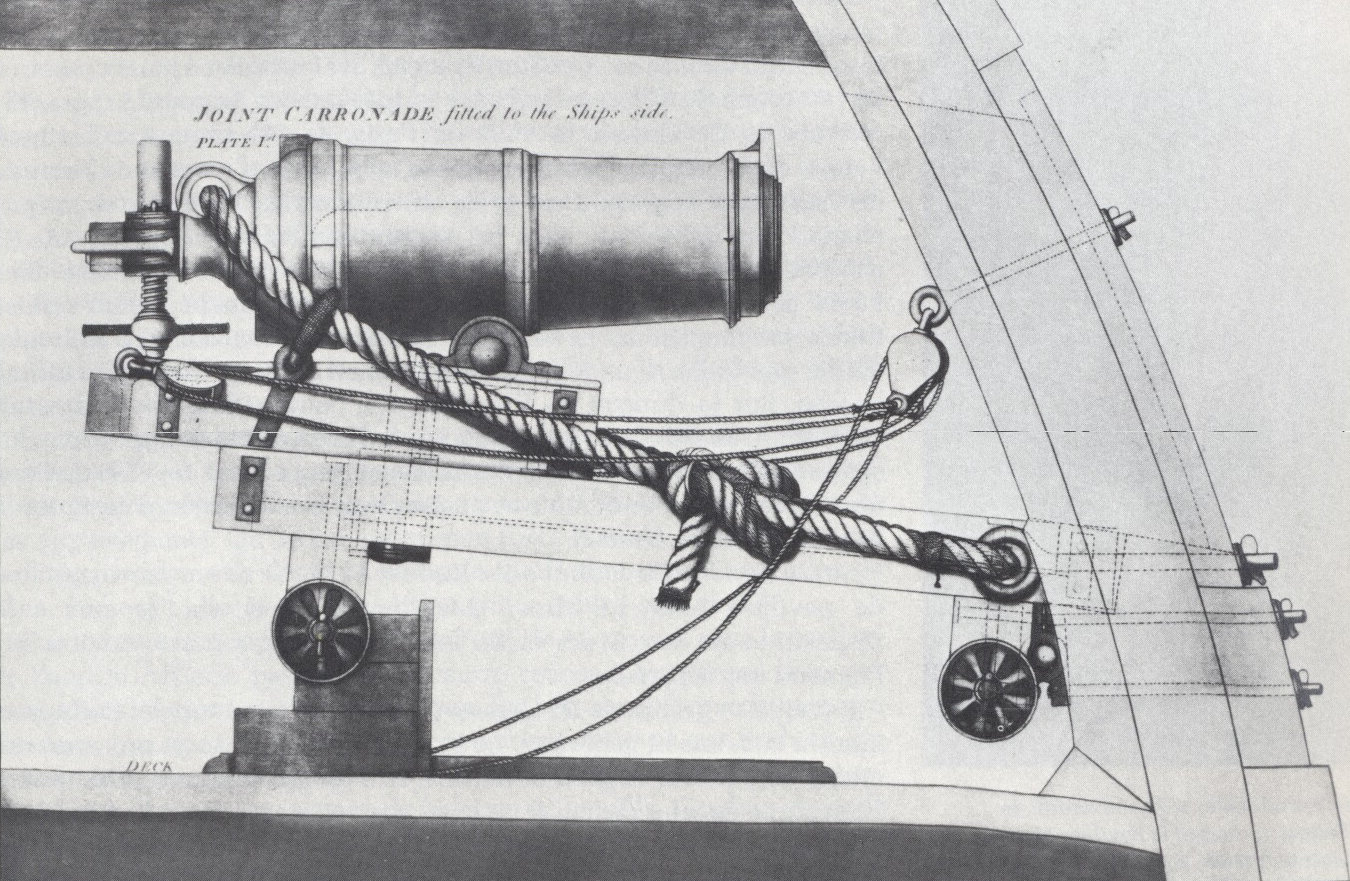
Late 18th century carronade

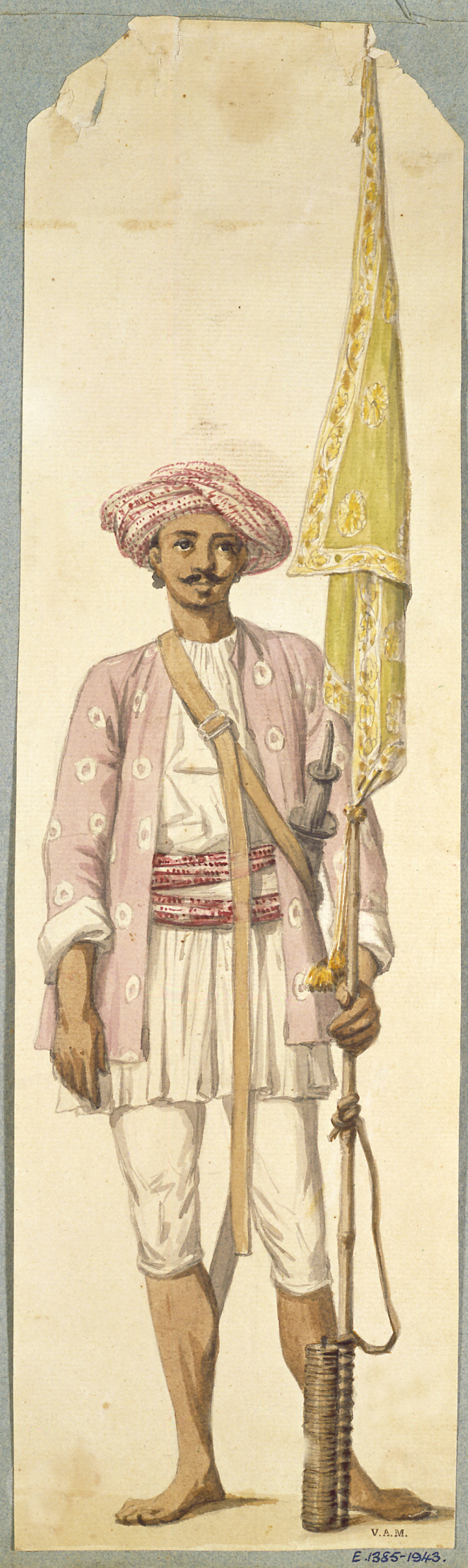
Tipu Sultan soldier using a Mysorean rocket as a flag staff

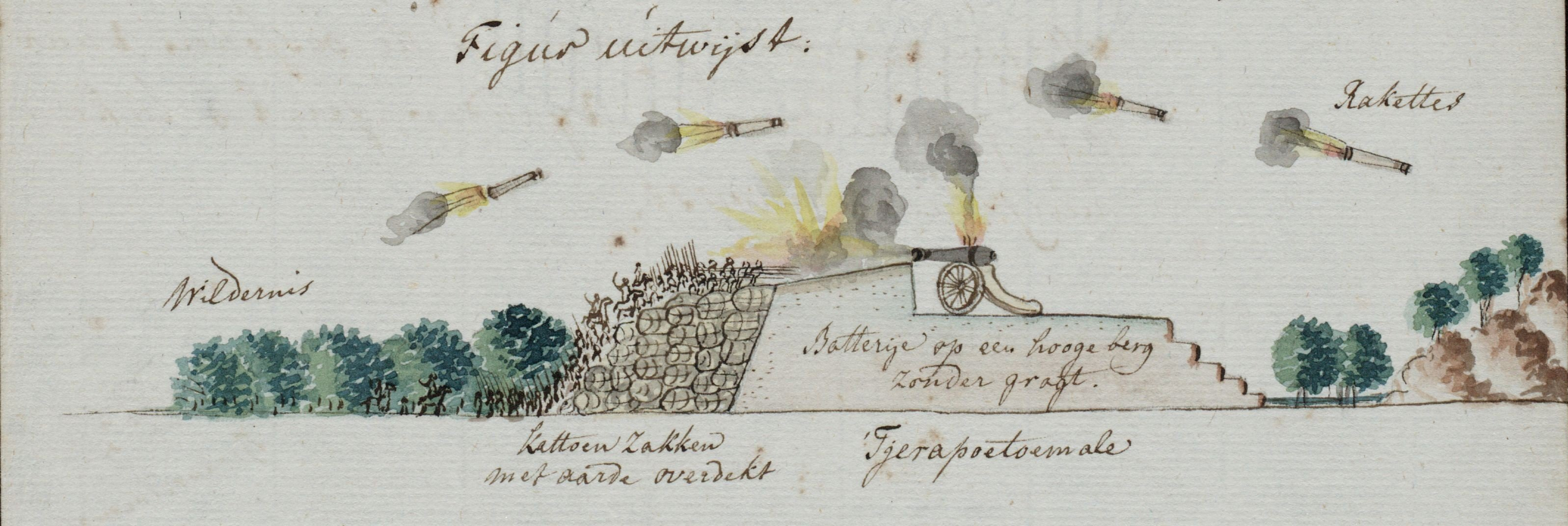
Illustration of Mysorean rockets used by the troops of Tipu Sultan

== 19th century ==
Major developments: Sir William Congreve, 2nd Baronet develops the Congreve rockets based on Mysorean rockets and British forces successfully deploy them against Copenhagen. Joshua Shaw invents percussion caps which replace the flintlock trigger mechanism. Claude-Étienne Minié invents the Minié ball, making rifles a viable military firearm, ending the era of smoothbore muskets. Subsequently rifles are deployed in the Crimean War with resounding success. Benjamin Tyler Henry invents the Henry rifle, the first reliable repeating rifle. Richard Jordan Gatling invents the Gatling gun, capable of firing 200 cartridges in a minute. Hiram Maxim invents the Maxim gun, the first single-barreled machine gun. Both China and Europe start using cast iron molds for casting cannons. Alfred Nobel invents dynamite, the first stable explosive stronger than gunpowder. Smokeless powder is invented and replaces the traditional "black powder" in Europe by the end of the century.

Year	Date	Region	Event
1803		West	England starts producing shrapnel shells.
1804		West	Sir William Congreve, 2nd Baronet starts experimenting extensively with rockets based on Mysorean rockets.
1805		West	Congreve rockets are produced in Britain.
1807		West	British forces successfully deploy 40,000 rockets and ignite devastating fires in Copenhagen
1812		West	Jean Samuel Pauly invents a cartridge containing a primer, making it the first self-contained cartridge.
1812		West	Joseph Manton patents the gravitating lock, which prevents muzzle loaders from accidentally firing while the muzzle is held upward.
1815		West	Joshua Shaw invents percussion caps.
1820		West	British guns are manufactured with bouched vents.
1825		West	The percussion cap mechanism starts replacing flintlocks in Europe.
1829		West	Rocket programs in continental Europe fizzle out as poor performance lead to their rejection until the 20th century.
1830		West	The percussion cap becomes the most widely accepted firing mechanism in Europe.
1831		West	William Bickford invents the safety fuse.
1835		West	Casimir Lefaucheux invents the first practical breech loading firearm with a cartridge.
1836		West	Johann Nicolaus von Dreyse invents the Dreyse needle gun, a breech loading rifle, increasing the rate of fire to six times that of muzzle loading weapons.
1837		West	Edward Alfred Cowper uses gunpowder explosions as railway fog-signals to alert the locomotive crew of danger.
1841		China	Wei Yuan recommends the incorporation of flintlock firearms into the Qing army but matchlocks continue to be used.
1845		China	Gong Zhenlin invents cast iron molds for the casting of iron cannons.
1849		West	Claude-Étienne Minié invents the Minié ball and makes the rifle a viable military firearm, ending the smoothbore musket era.
1854		West	Rifles are deployed during the Crimean War with resounding success, proving to be vastly superior to smoothbore muskets.
1854		West	Volcanic Repeating Arms produces a rifle with a self-contained cartridge.
1855		West	The Elswick Ordnance Company starts producing the Armstrong Gun.
1855		West	Edward Boxer uses rockets for throwing life-lines to shipwrecked sailors.
1860		West	Benjamin Tyler Henry invents the Henry rifle, the first reliable repeating rifle.
1861		West	Richard Jordan Gatling invents the Gatling gun, capable of firing 200 gunpowder cartridges in a minute.
1862		China	The Qing dynasty starts production of percussion caps for rifles.
1862		China	Li Xiucheng of the Taiping army equips his army with foreign rifles.
1863		West	Alfred Nobel invents dynamite, the first stable explosive stronger than gunpowder.
1864		China	Li Hongzhang of the Qing dynasty equips his army with 15,000 foreign rifles.
1873		West	Winchester Repeating Arms Company introduces the Model 1873 Winchester rifle.
1873		West	In Europe cast iron molds are utilized in casting cannons.
1877	20 July – 10 December	West	Siege of Plevna: The first time metallic cartridge repeating rifles have a large impact in battle.
1880		West	Smokeless powder is invented and starts replacing gunpowder, also known as black powder.
1884		West	Hiram Maxim invents the Maxim gun, the first single-barreled machine gun.
1886		West	A safer and more stable form of smokeless powder is invented in France.
1890		West	European countries transition to smokeless powder, which is referred to as "gunpowder", whereas the old mixture is known as "black powder".

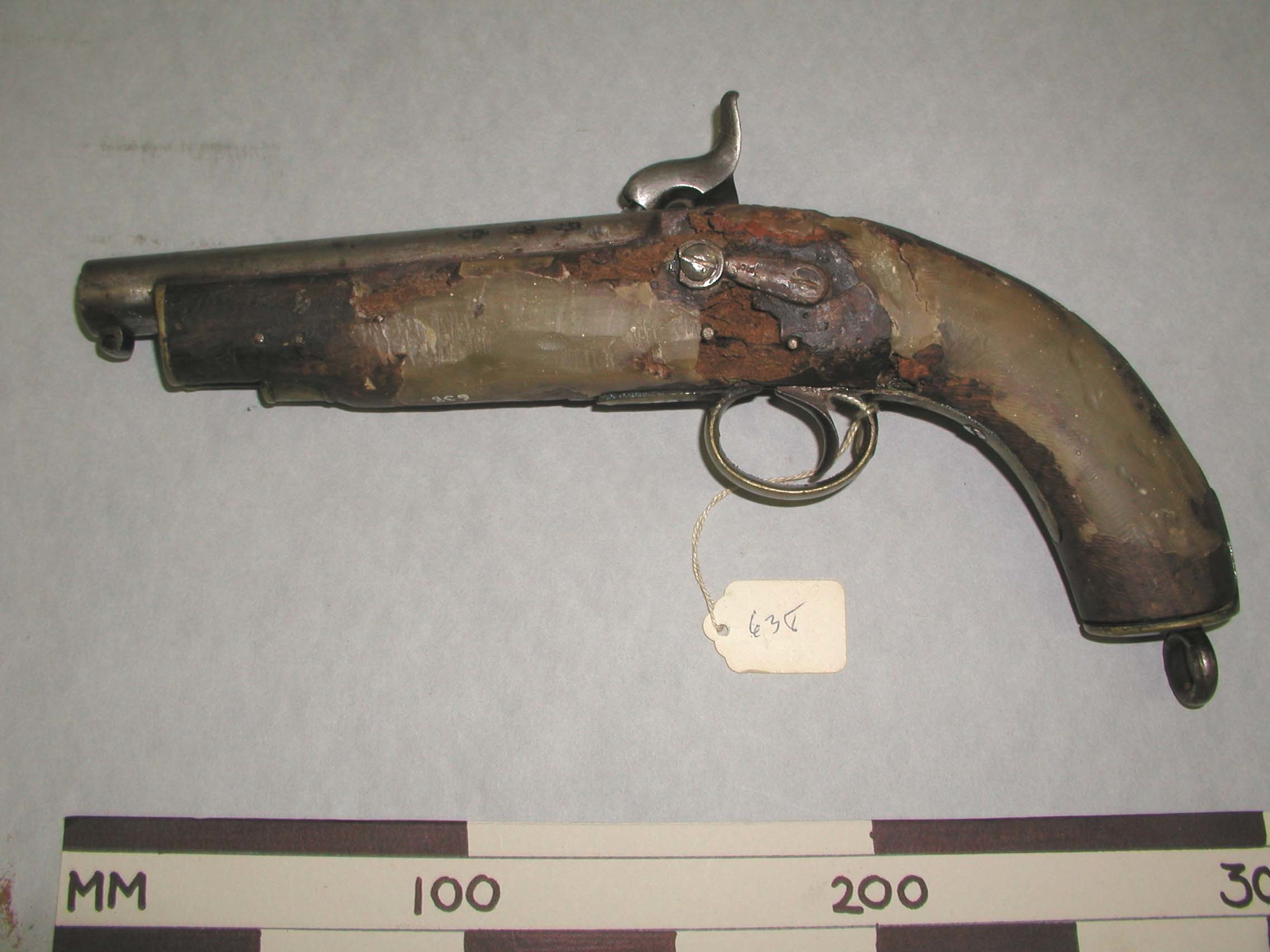
Percussion cap pistol

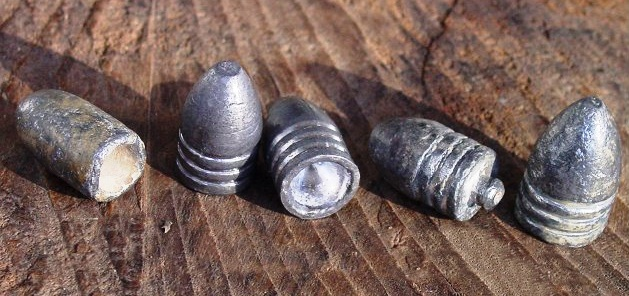
Minié balls

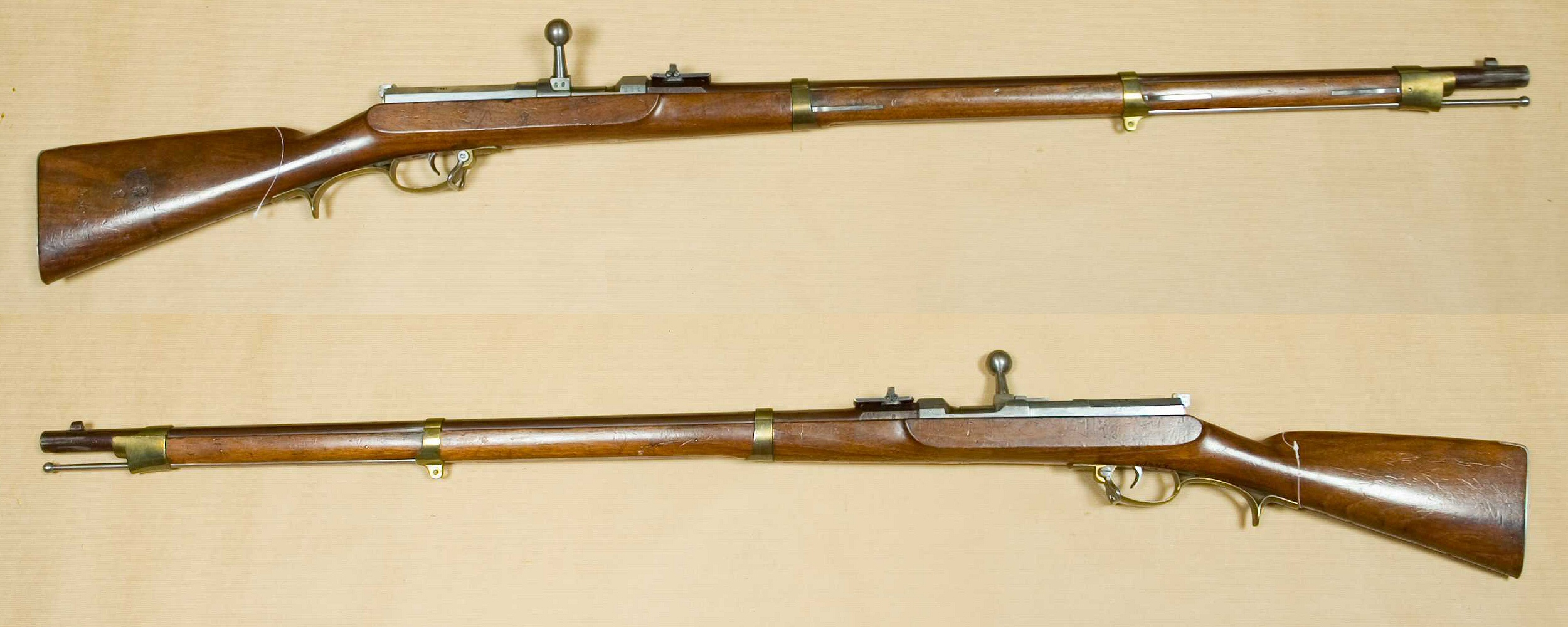
Dreyse needle gun

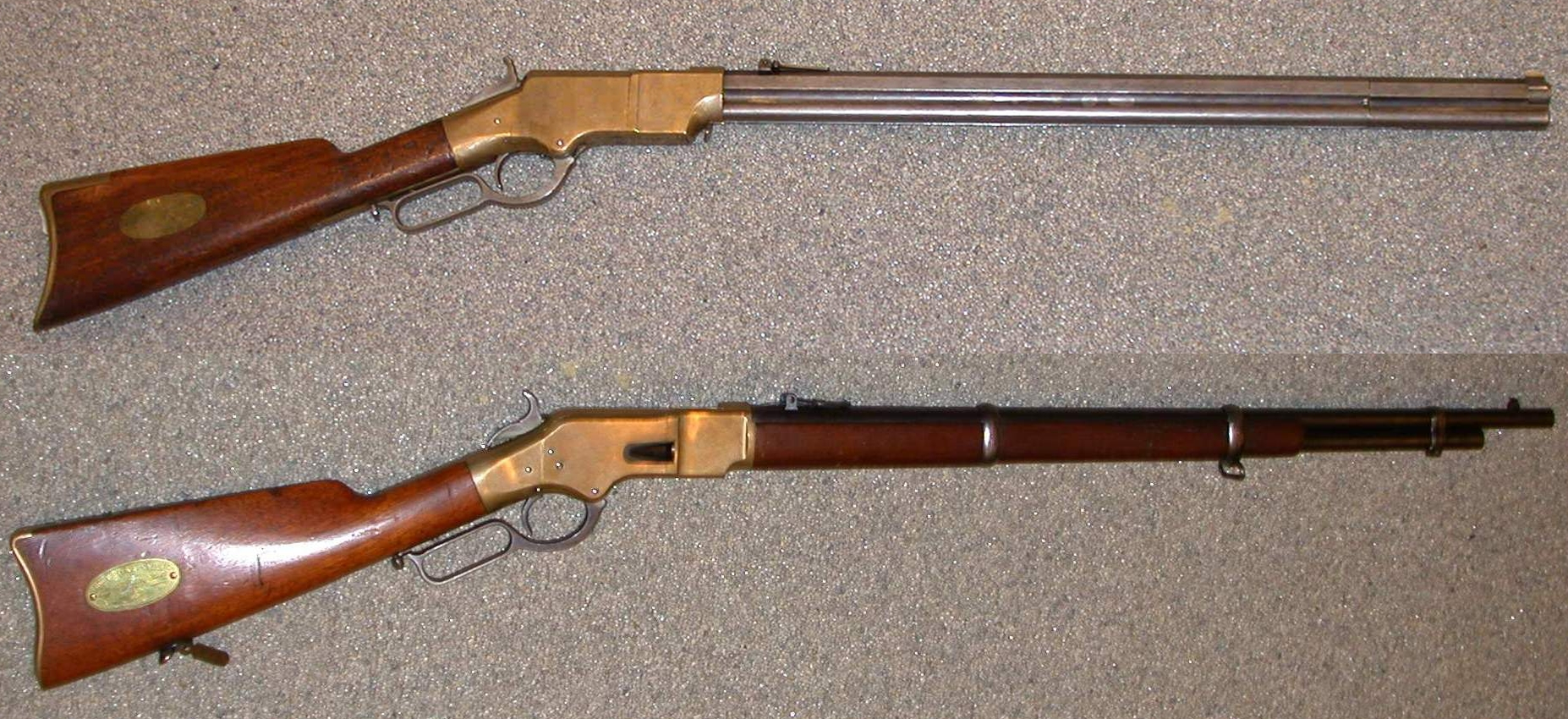
The Henry rifle and Winchester rifle

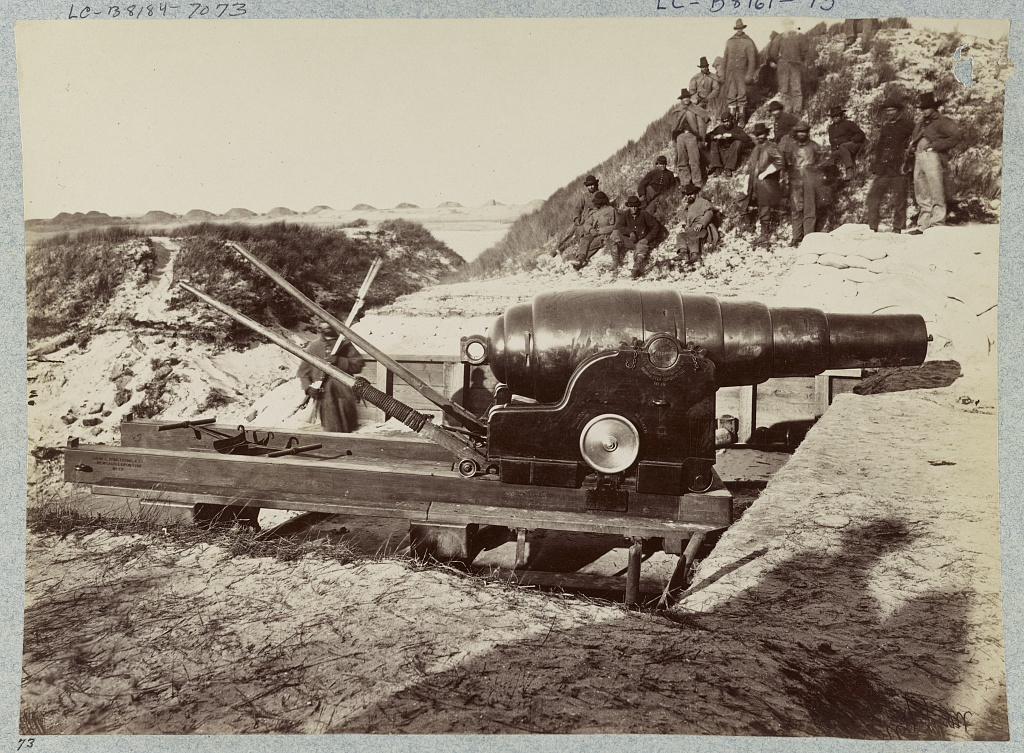
Armstrong gun

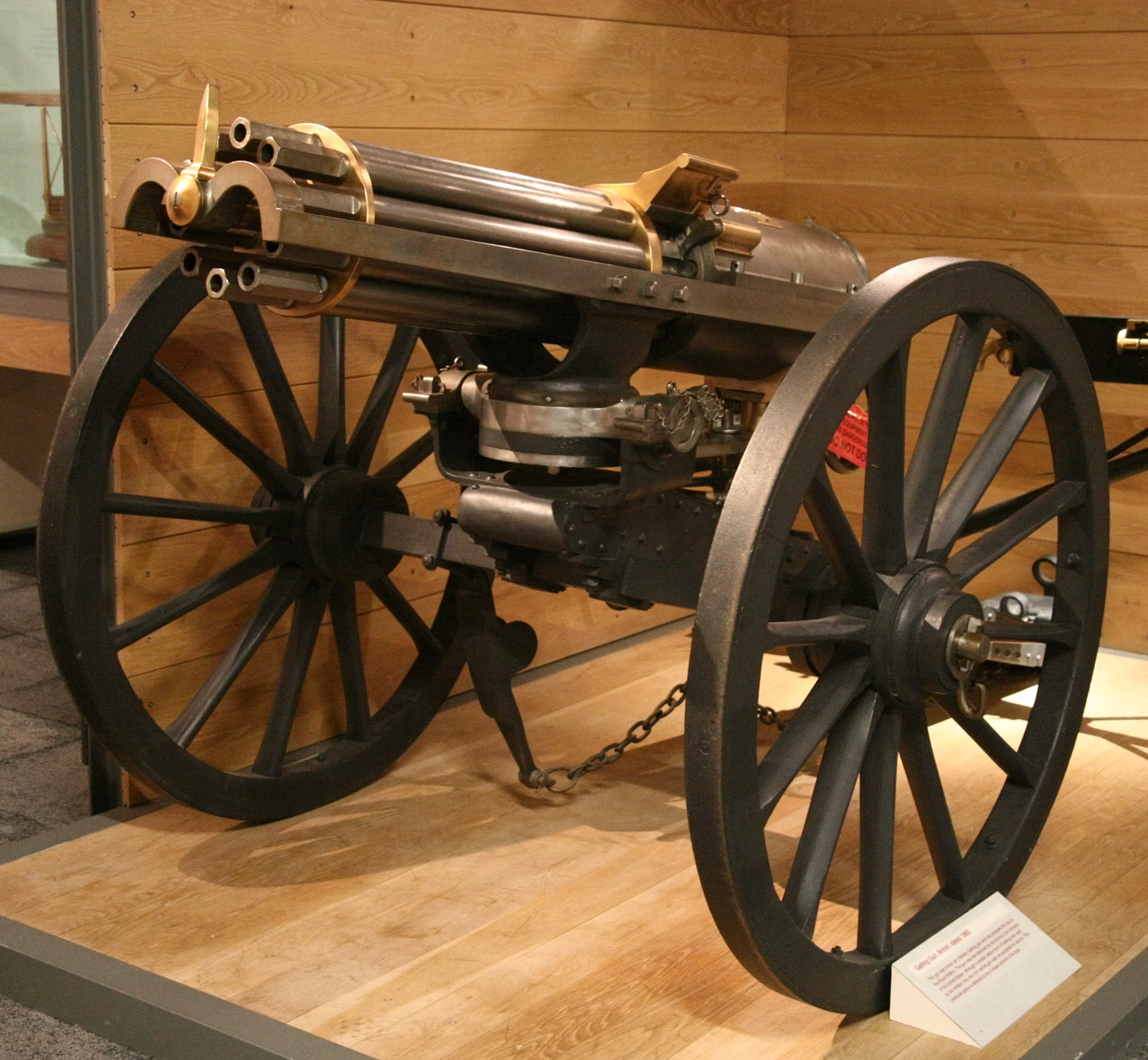
Gatling gun

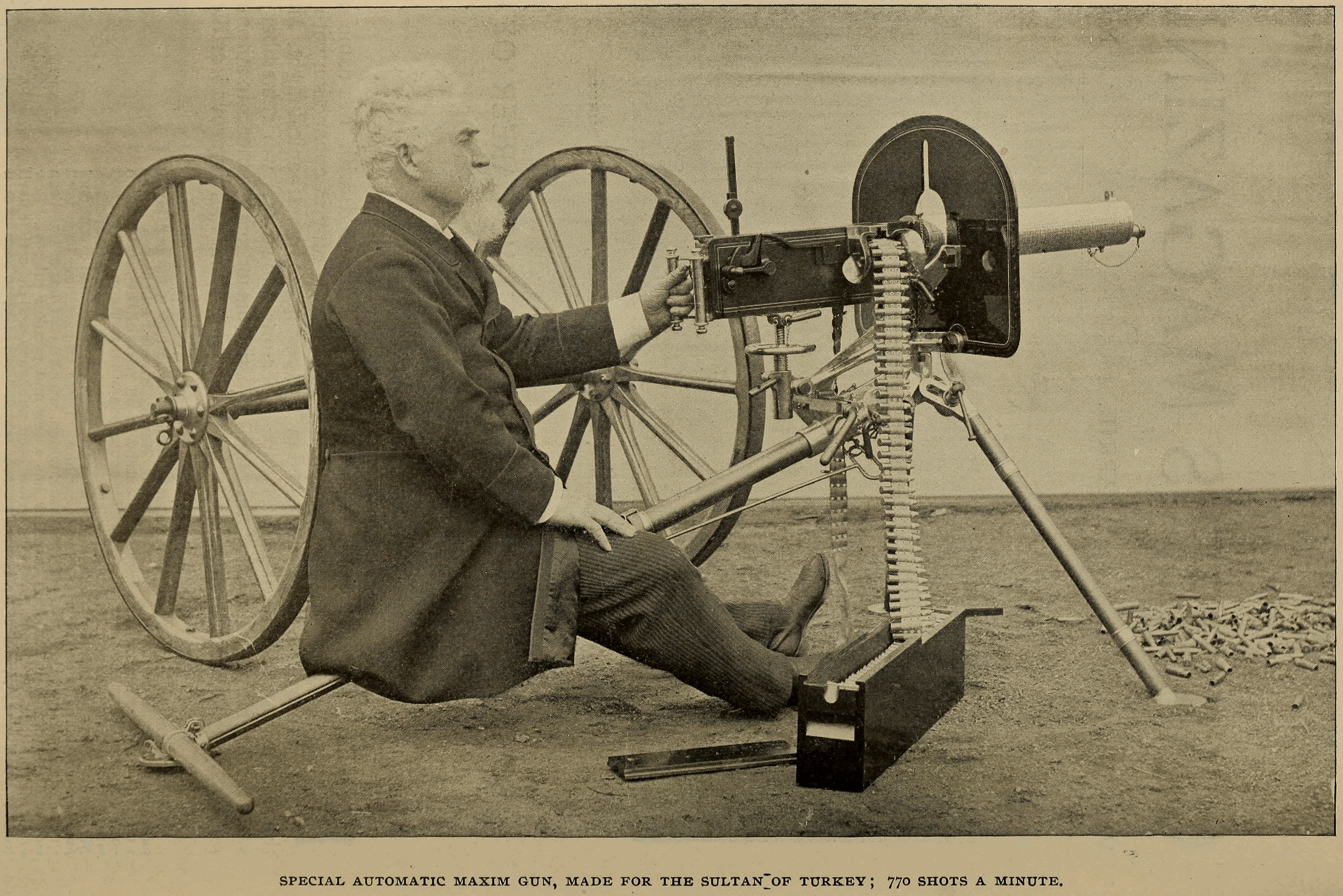
Maxim gun

== 20th century ==
Major developments: Smokeless powder replaces traditional "black powder" across the globe, ending the gunpowder age.

Year	Date	Region	Event
1902		Worldwide	Smokeless powder is adopted nearly everywhere in the world and "black powder" is relegated to hobbyist usage, ending the Gunpowder Age.

== See also ==
- Timeline of the gunpowder age in Japan
- Timeline of the gunpowder age in Korea
- Timeline of the gunpowder age in South Asia
- Timeline of the gunpowder age in Southeast Asia
