= Huolongchushui =

Early Chinese rocket weapon

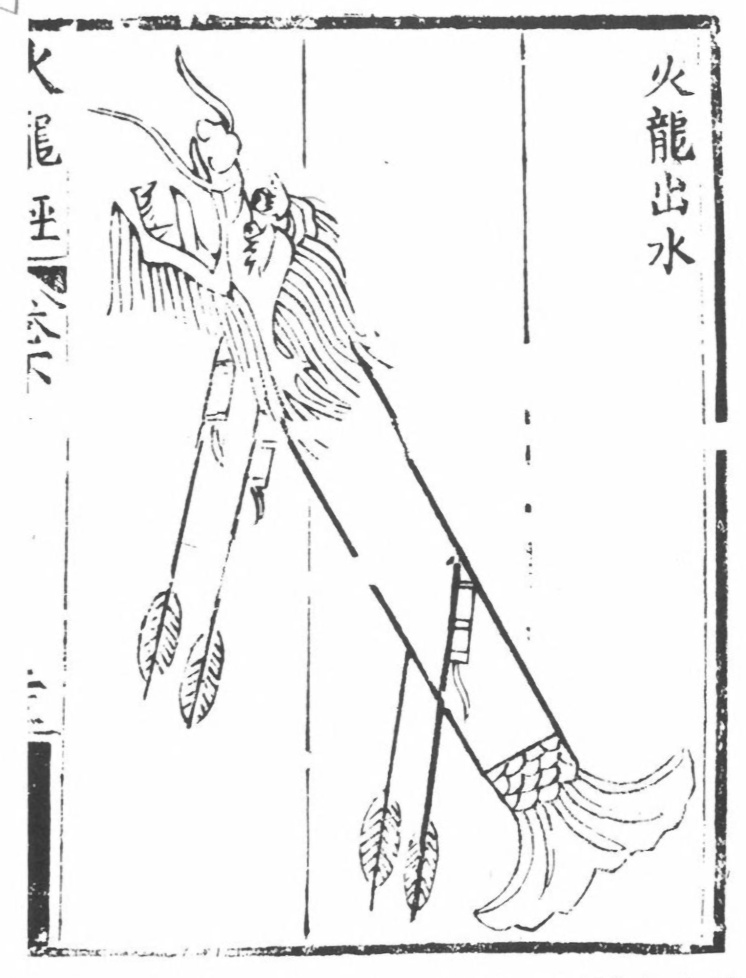
A 'fire dragon rising out of the water' (huo long chu shui) multistage rocket from the Huolongjing

Huolongchushui (simplified Chinese: 火龙出水; traditional Chinese: 火龍出水; pinyin: huǒlóngchūshuǐ; lit. ''fire dragon out of water'') were the earliest form of multistage rockets used in post-classical China. The name of the weapon was used to strike fear into enemy troops. If the enemy was out of range of the rocket itself, the fire dragon fired a magazine of three rocket-driven arrows in the mouth of the projectile. It was one of the world's earliest multistage rockets. The weapon was fired at enemy ships in naval battles.

== Overview ==
The Huolongchushui had a hollow bamboo tube with a carved wooden dragon head and tail about 1.5m long. The front and rear contained four rockets packed with gunpowder that propelled the dragon forwards. Fuses facing downwards out of the four rockets outside the dragon body were linked with the fuses of the rockets inside the dragon's belly. Just before the four rockets on the outside burnt out, it would ignite the fuses of arrow rockets hidden inside the rear of the dragon, which would then shoot out of its mouth propelled by the gunpowder. The Huolongchushui was used on both land and sea, operating on the principle of a two-stage rocket. The two-stage rocket had a booster rocket attached to it that would then burn out automatically, issuing a batch of smaller rockets hidden inside the dragon's belly.

== History ==
The Huolongchushui is depicted in the 14th century Chinese military treatise Huolongjing by Jiao Yu and Liu Bowen during the early Ming dynasty.
