= Fire lance =

Early gunpowder weapon

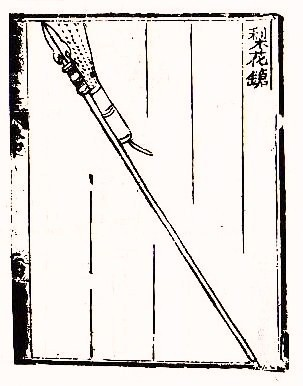
A fire lance as depicted in the Huolongjing, late 14th century (c. 1360-1375)

The fire lance (simplified Chinese: 火枪; traditional Chinese: 火槍; pinyin: huǒqiāng; lit. 'fire spear') was a gunpowder weapon used by lighting it on fire, and is the ancestor of modern firearms. It first appeared in 10th–12th century China and was used to great effect during the Jin–Song Wars. It began as a small pyrotechnic device attached to a polearm weapon, used to gain a shock advantage at the start of a melee. As gunpowder improved, the explosive discharge was increased, and debris or pellets added, giving it some of the effects of a combination modern flamethrower and shotgun, but with a very short range (about 3 meters or 10 feet), and only one shot (although some were designed for two shots). By the late 13th century, fire lance barrels had transitioned to metal material to better withstand the explosive blast, and the lance-point was discarded in favor of relying solely on the gunpowder blast. These became the first hand cannons.

== Design ==
The first fire lances consisted of a tube, usually bamboo, containing gunpowder and a slow match, strapped to a spear or other polearm weapon. Once ignited, the gunpowder tube would ideally eject a stream of flames in the direction of the spearhead. Projectiles such as iron pellets or pottery shards were later added to the gunpowder. Upon firing, the gunpowder charge ejected the projectiles along with the flame.

Metallic fire lance barrels appeared around the mid-13th century and these began to be used independently of the lance itself. The independent metallic barrel was known as an 'eruptor' and became the forerunner of the hand cannon.

In Europe, versions with wooden tubes were used.

== History ==
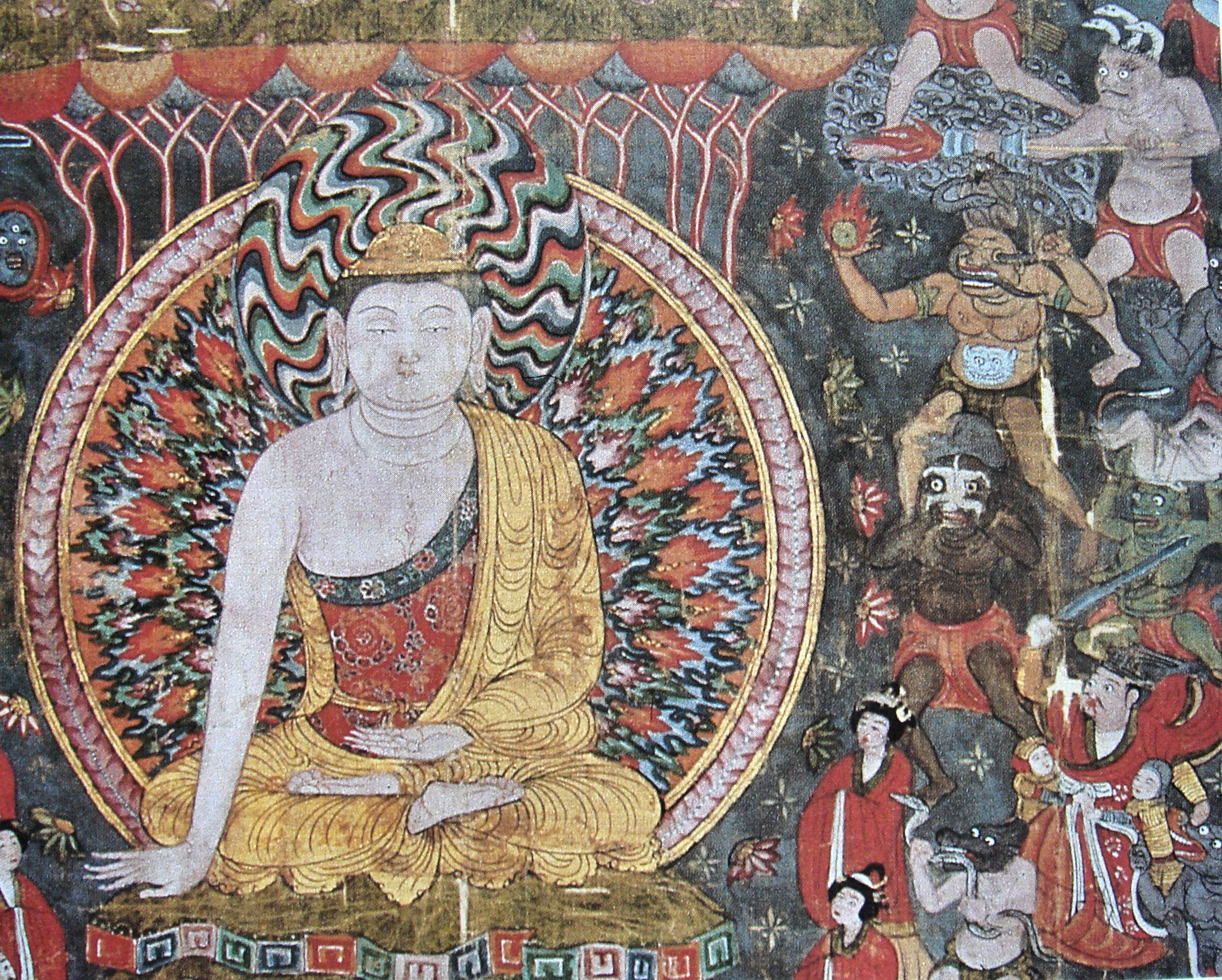
Earliest known representation of a fire lance (upper right), Dunhuang, 950 AD

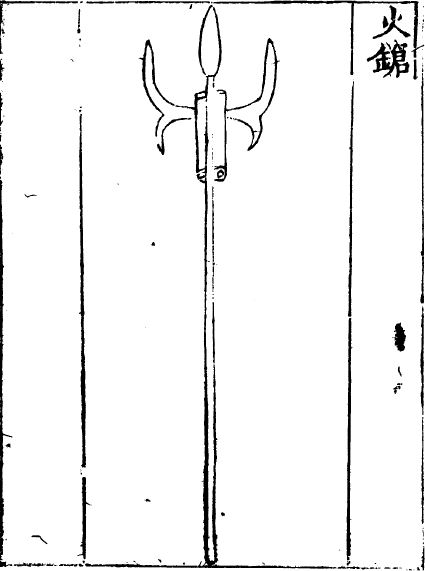
A double-barreled fire lance from the Huolongjing. Supposedly, the barrels fired in succession, with the second barrel lit automatically after the first barrel's firing.

=== China ===
The earliest evidence of fire lances appeared in China in the year 950. However usage of fire lances in warfare was not mentioned until 1132 when Song garrisons used them during the Siege of De'an, in modern-day Anlu, Hubei, in a sortie against the Jin dynasty (1115–1234).

In 1163, fire lances were attached to war carts known as "at-your-desire-carts" used to defend mobile firebomb trebuchets.

In the late 1100s, pieces of shrapnel such as porcelain shards and small iron pellets were added to the gunpowder tube. At some point fire lances discarded the spearhead altogether and relied solely on their firepower.

By 1232, the Jin were also using fire lances, but with improved reusable barrels consisting of durable paper material. According to the History of Jin, these fire lances had a range of roughly three meters:

To make the lance, use chi-huang paper, sixteen layers of it for the tube, and make it a bit longer than two feet. Stuff it with willow charcoal, iron fragments, magnet ends, sulfur, white arsenic [probably an error that should mean saltpeter], and other ingredients, and put a fuse to the end. Each troop has hanging on him a little iron pot to keep fire [probably hot coals], and when it's time to do battle, the flames shoot out the front of the lance more than ten feet, and when the gunpowder is depleted, the tube isn't destroyed.

— History of Jin

In 1233, Jin soldiers used fire lances successfully against the Mongols. Pucha Guannu led 450 Jin fire lancers and routed an entire Mongol encampment. The Mongol soldiers were apparently disdainful of other Jin weapons, but greatly feared the fire lance.

On the 5th day of the 5th lunar month [in the year 1233] the Jin troops offered a sacrifice to Heaven. They began to prepare their huoqiang or 'fire lances' [i.e. fei huoqiang or 'flying fire lances'] and other weapons in secrecy. Then Marshal Pucha, at the head of 450 soldiers of the Loyal and Filial Army, embarked from the South Gate [of Guidefu] and sailed from the East to the North, killing the Mongol night patrols along the river bank until they arrived at Wangjiasi [where the Mongols had set up camp], . . In the fourth watch of the night the Jin troops attacked the Mongols. At first the Loyal and Filial Army retreated slightly, then suddenly attacked again. Pucha Guannu divided his soldiers into teams of 50 to 70, each in a small boat, ordering them to advance to the Mongol camp and attack it from all sides. Carrying their fire lances, the Jin soldiers launched a sudden attack which the Mongols were unable to resist. It was a great defeat, for in all 3500 Mongols were drowned in the river. Guannu burned their camp to the ground and returned [to Guifu].

— History of Jin

In 1259, a pellet wad that occluded the barrel was recorded to have been used as a fire lance projectile, making it the first recorded bullet in history.

By 1276, the character used for "lance" (槍/鎗) in fire lance had switched from using the "wood" radical (木) to "metal" (金), suggesting that fire lances had transitioned to metal barrels. Fire lances were also being used by cavalrymen at this point, as evidenced by the account of a Song-Yuan battle in which two fire lance armed Song cavalrymen rushed a Chinese officer of Bayan of the Baarin. The Huolongjing also mentions a gourd fire lance which was used by cavalrymen as well as foot soldiers.

The metal-barreled fire lance began to be used independently of the lance around the mid to late 13th century. These proto-cannons which fired co-viative projectiles, known as 'eruptors,' were the forerunners of the hand cannon.

=== Later history ===
By 1280, the Middle East had acquired fire lances.

In 1396, European knights took up fire lances as mounted weapons.

In 15th century Japanese samurai used fire lances.

The last recorded usage of fire lances in Europe occurred during the Storming of Bristol in 1643 although the Commonwealth of England was still issuing them to ships in 1660.

=== Troncks ===
Versions where the fireworks and shot were placed in a wooden tube at the end of a pole were known as troncks, fire-trunks or bombas in Europe. The fireworks had alternating slow and fast burning sections.

They were frequently issued to warships and a surviving example was found in the wreck of the La Trinidad Valencera. Testing of an attempted reconstruction was carried out in 1988. During the test multiple sections of the Tronck ignited at once.

== Gallery ==
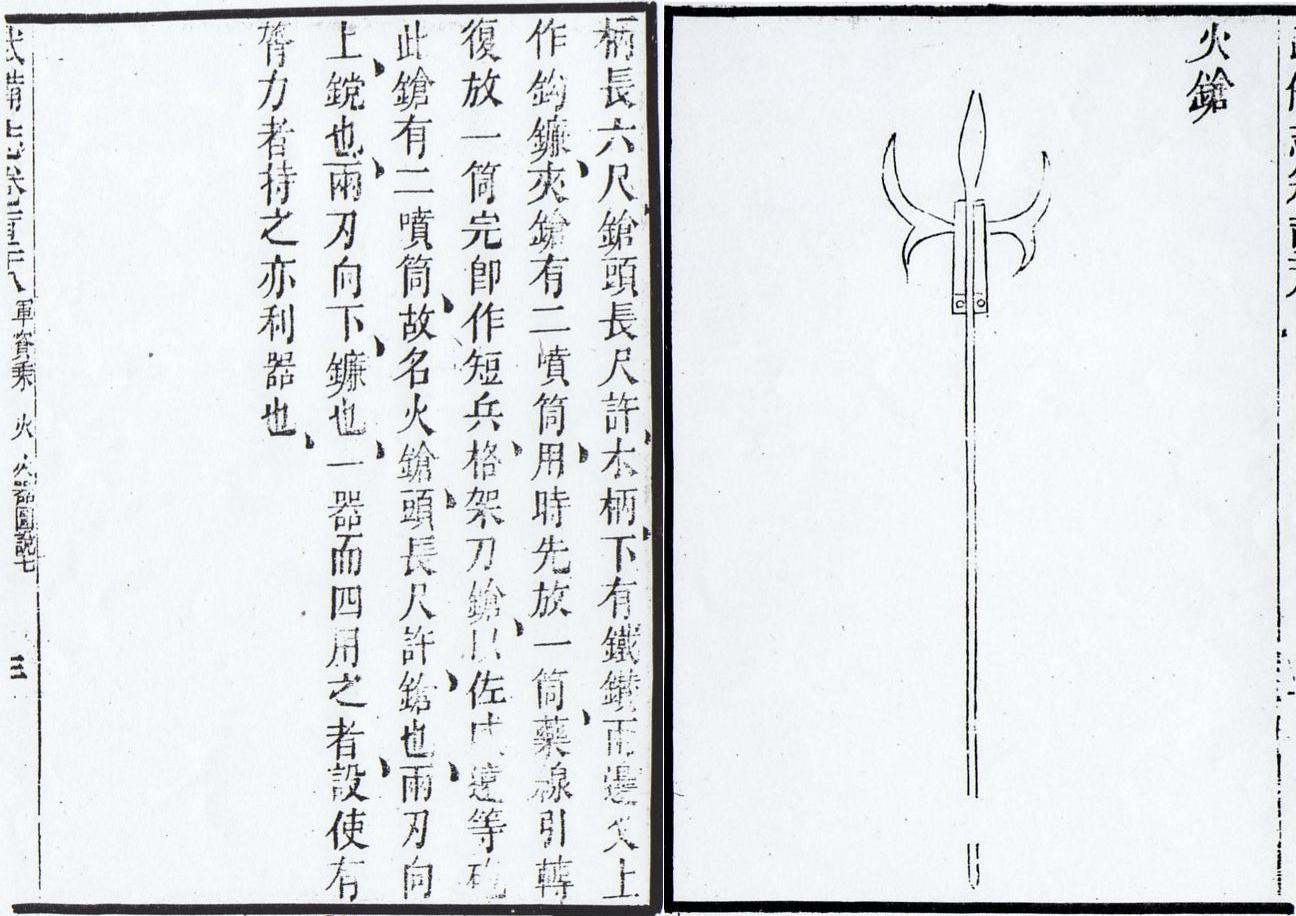
A fire lance from the Wubei Zhi by Mao Yuanyi, 1621.

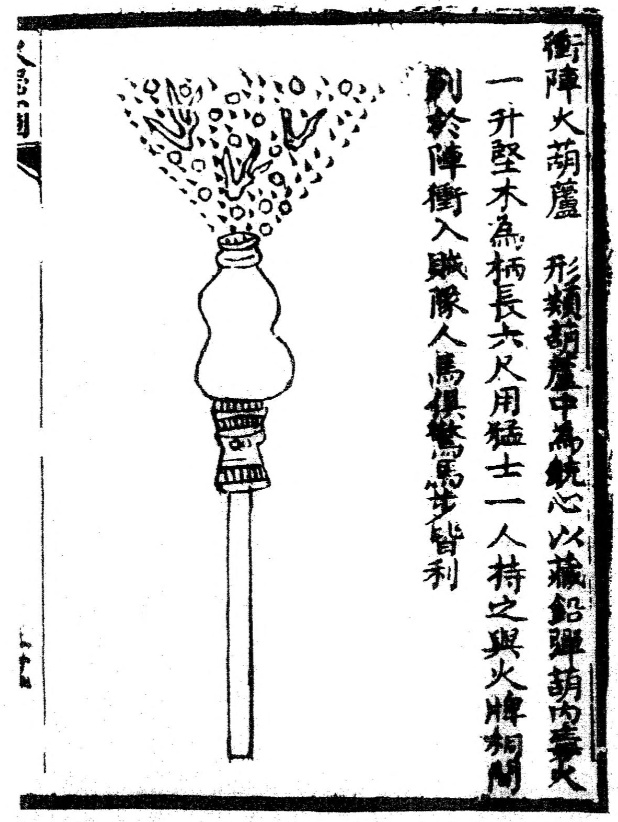
The phalanx-charging fire-gourd, one of many fire lance types discharging lead pellets in the gunpowder blast, an illustration from the Huolongjing.

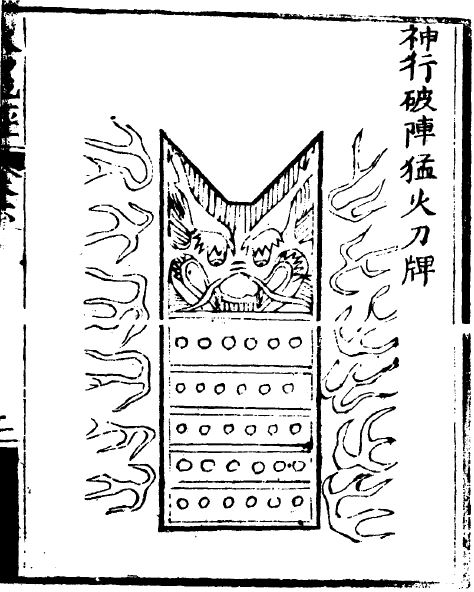
A 'divine moving phalanx-breaking fierce-fire sword-shield' as depicted in the Huolongjing, c. 1360-1375. A mobile shield fitted with fire lances used to break enemy formations.

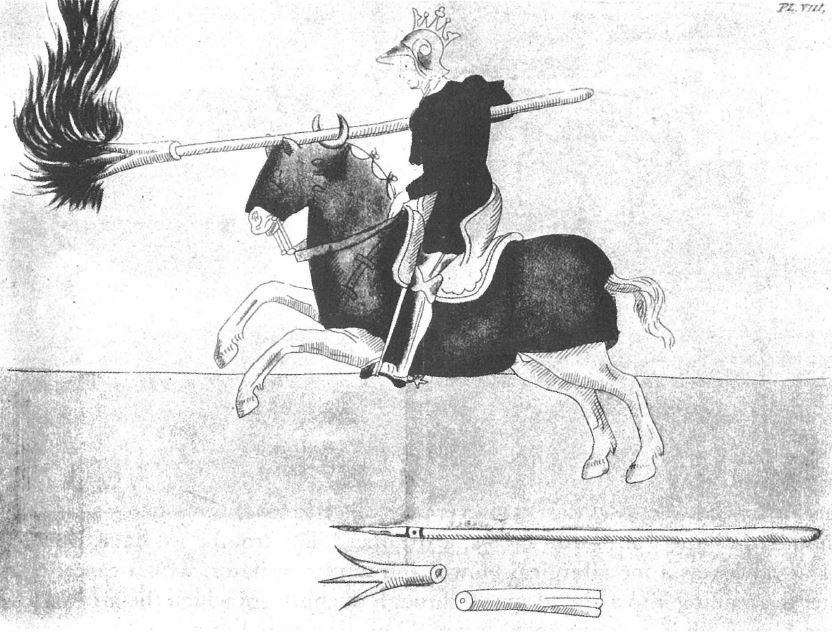
Medieval knight wielding a fire lance c. 1396.

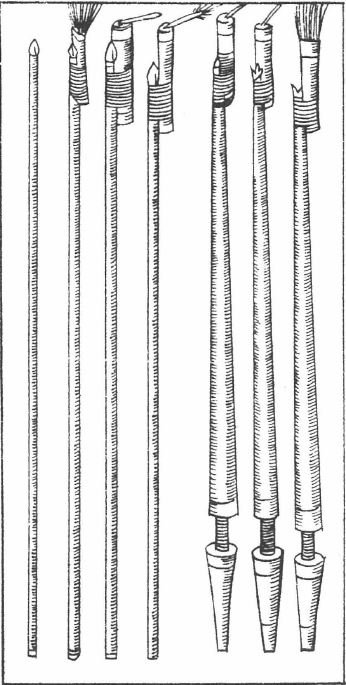
Illustrations of fire lances from De la pirotechnia by Vannoccio Biringuccio c. 1540.

== See also ==
- Early modern warfare
- Science and technology of the Song dynasty
- Jiao Yu
- Huolongjing
- Xun Lei Chong
- Lunge mine
