= Jiao Yu =

Chinese military general, philosopher, and writer of the Yuan and Ming dynasties

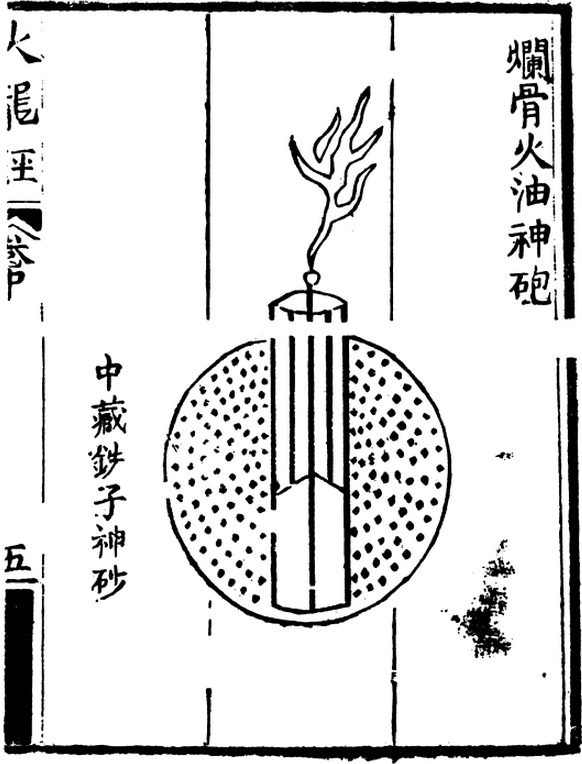
An illustration of a fragmentation bomb from the Huolongjing. The black dots represent iron pellets.

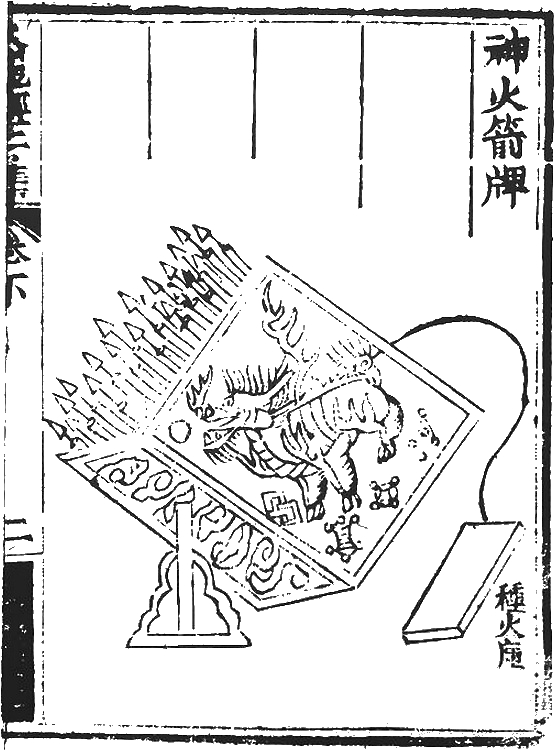
Depiction of a fire arrow rocket launcher from the Huolongjing

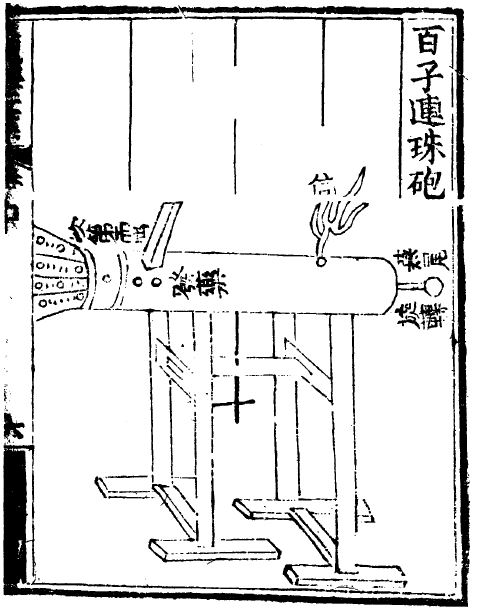
Essentially a fire lance on a frame, the 'multiple bullets magazine eruptor' shoots lead shots, which are loaded in a magazine and fed into the barrel when turned around on its axis.

Jiao Yu (Chinese: 焦玉; pinyin: Jiāo Yù; Wade–Giles: Chiao Yü) was a Chinese military general, philosopher, and writer of the Yuan dynasty and Ming dynasty. He was entrusted by the Zhu Yuanzhang (the future Hongwu Emperor) as a leading artillery officer for the rebel army that eventually overthrew the Yuan dynasty and established the Ming dynasty.

As a senior adviser and general, he was later appointed to the venerable and noble status of the Count of Dongning. He edited and wrote a famous military treatise that outlined the use of Chinese military technology during the mid 14th century based on his military campaign of 1355 AD. However, descriptions of some gunpowder weapons in his treatise derive from Song dynasty (960–1279 AD) materials on battles against the Khitans (Liao dynasty), Jurchens (Jin dynasty), and Mongols. His Huolongjing, translated as the Fire Drake Manual, contains descriptions of fire arrows, fire lances, grenades, firearms, bombards, cannons, exploding cannonballs, land mines, naval mines, rockets, rocket launchers, two-stage rockets, and various gunpowder solutions including poisonous concoctions.

== Life and career ==
Jiao Yu was an aspiring scholar in his youth during the Yuan dynasty, but was not accepted into government service. Jiao Yu met an adept Daoist intellect living in the Tiantai Mountain known as Chichi Daoren (the "Knowing-when-to-stop Daoist"). Like Jiao Yu, Daoren accepted the teachings of Confucius and Mencius, but in military affairs Jiao was convinced that he had inherited the skill of the ancient Sun Tzu. After Jiao Yu became his protégé, Daoren urged Yu to join the cause of Zhu Yuanzhang's rebellion. Daoren had also shared with him various literary works on 'fire-weapons' and their recorded uses in battle. After joining his ranks, Jiao Yu became one of Zhu Yuanzhang's trusted confidants in the Red Turban Rebellion against the Yuan dynasty. Zhu was impressed with Jiao's knowledge of firearms which he had earlier acquired from Daoren, yet Zhu wanted to test their abilities. Zhu ordered his officer Xu Da to provide a demonstration of their destructive capabilities, and after the display Zhu Yuanzhang was most impressed with their power.

With the aid of Jiao's 'fire-weapons', Zhu's army, once stationed in Hezhou among a plethora of different rebel groups in surrounding towns, conquered Jingzhou and Xiangzhou in one expedition. In the second expedition the provinces of Jiang and Zhe, and in the third campaign the entire province of Fujian was taken, including its surrounding waterways. After this, Zhu's army captured the whole of Shandong in one campaign, strengthening his base while the authority of the Mongol regime at Beijing was collapsing all around. Zhu finally drove the Mongols north in 1367, establishing a new capital at Nanjing soon after while Beijing became the secondary capital.

After the successful rebellion and establishment of Zhu Yuanzhang as the Ming dynasty's new Hongwu Emperor, Jiao was charged with manufacturing firearms for the government. Jiao was eventually appointed as the head officer of the enormous Shen Zhi Ying Armory, where multitudes of manufactured guns and artillery were deposited for storage and safekeeping. Proper maintenance and safety measures for gunpowder arsenals were taken very seriously during Jiao's time due to the memory of previous disasters during the Song dynasty, such as Prime Minister Zhao Nanchong's personal arsenal catching fire and exploding in 1260 AD, alongside the monumental disaster of the enormous Weiyang arsenal accidentally catching fire in 1280 AD and killing more than 100 people. With Zhu Yuanzhang in power over the government, he established various production facilities in the capital at Nanjing for the manufacture of gunpowder and fire-weapons, stored in various arsenals throughout the country. The Hongwu Emperor established a new Gunpowder Department in the central administration of the capital. Jiao Yu placed a lot of emphasis on the importance of fire-weapons, as he once wrote in a preface to his book, "the very existence or destruction of the Empire, and the lives of the whole armed forces depend on the exact timing of these weapons. This is what fire-weapons are all about."

Along with the scholar, general, and court adviser Liu Bowen (1311–1375), Jiao Yu became an editor of the 14th century military treatise known as the Huolongjing (Fire Drake Manual). The Nanyang publication of the book, known as the Huolongjing Quanzhi (Fire Drake Manual in One Complete Volume) featured a preface written by Jiao Yu much later in 1412 AD. Both publications falsely attributed the earliest passages of the book to the ancient Chinese Prime Minister Zhuge Liang (181–234 AD) of the Shu Han, even though gunpowder warfare did not exist in China until the advent of the gunpowder-fuse-ignited flamethrower (Pen Huo Qi) in the 10th century. The oldest passages found in the Huolongjing were collected from sources no earlier than circa 1270 AD.

Although Jiao Yu's biography does not appear in the History of Ming (1739), Yu was mentioned in Zhao Shizhen's Shenqipu (1598 AD), He Rubin's Binglu (1606 AD), and Jiao Xu's Zekelu (1643 AD). His text Huolongjing was reprinted in the 19th century, during the late Qing dynasty.

== The Huolongjing ==
The Huolongjing (Chinese: 火龍神器陣灋), compiled and edited by Jiao Yu and Liu Zhi, outlined the use of many different gunpowder weapons found in China during the 14th century. It provided information for:

- Various gunpowder compositions
- Descriptions of the Chinese hollow cast iron grenade bomb
- Descriptions of the Chinese fire arrow.
- Descriptions of explosive land mines.
- Descriptions of explosive naval mines.
- Descriptions of fire lances and proto-guns.
- Descriptions of bombards and cannons.
- Descriptions of hollow, gunpowder-packed exploding cannonballs
- Descriptions of handguns with possible serpentines used as components in matchlocks.
- Description of rocket launchers and two-stage rockets.
- Descriptions of winged rockets with fins attached for better aerodynamic stability

== See also ==
- Technology of the Song dynasty
- History of firearms
- Gunpowder warfare
- Black powder
- Battle of Tangdao
- Battle of Caishi
- Battle of Lake Poyang
- Liu Bowen
