= Battle of Tangdao =

Battle during the Jin-Song wars

Coordinates: 37°N 121°E

- Part of the Jin–Song wars
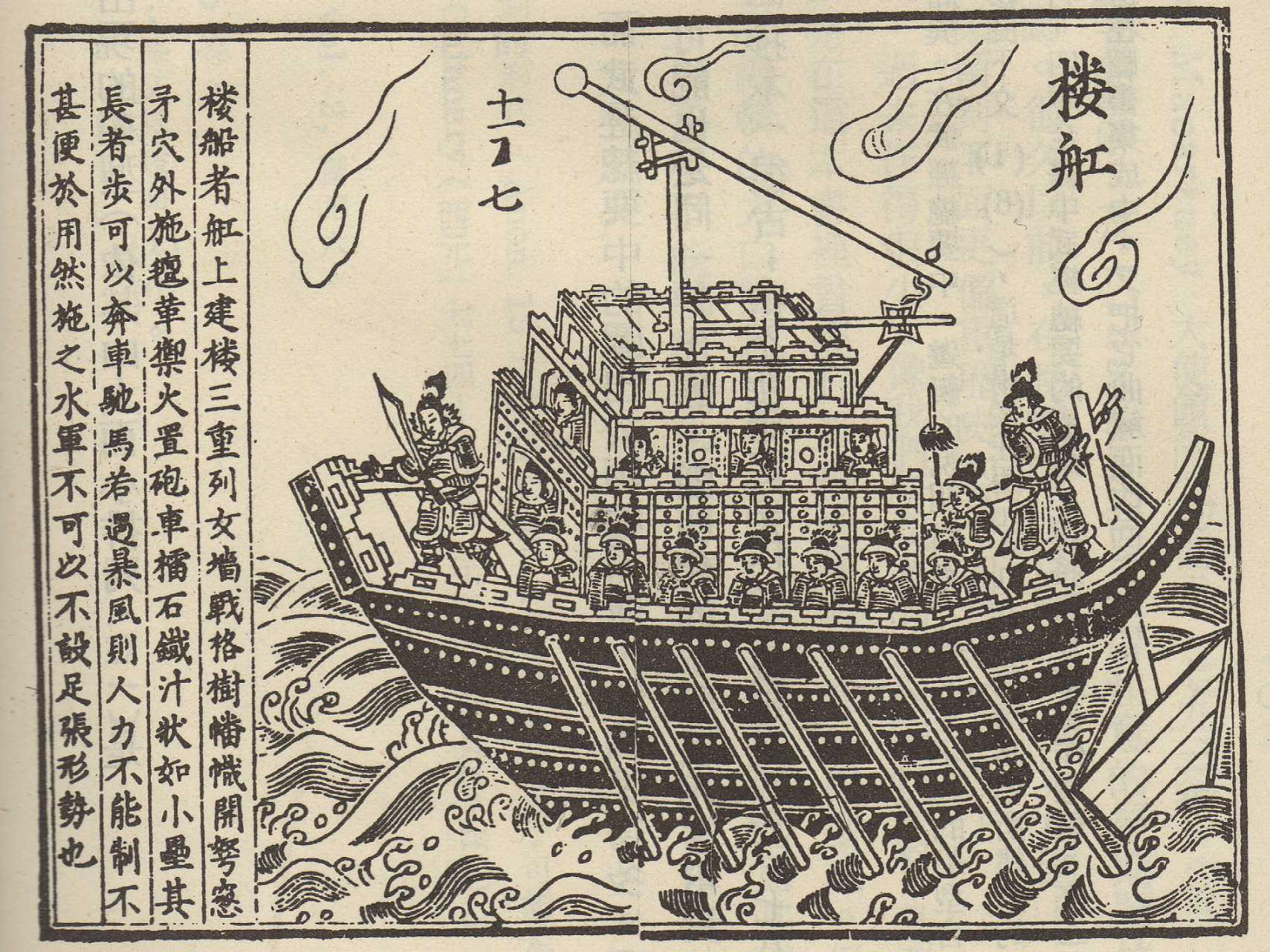
Date	16 November 1161
Location	Tang Island (唐島), off the coast of the Shandong Peninsula on the Yellow Sea
Result	Southern Song victory

Belligerents
Jin dynasty	Southern Song dynasty

Commanders and leaders
Su Baoheng; Wanyan Zhengjianu †	Li Bao

Strength
600 warships 20,000 Jurchen and Balhae troops 10,000 Northern Chinese; 40,000 sailors	120 warships and 3,000 troops

Casualties and losses
10,000; 300 warships	

The Battle of Tangdao or Battle of Tang Island (Chinese: 唐島之戰) was a naval engagement that took place in 1161 between the Southern Song dynasty and the Jin dynasty on the Yellow Sea, off the coast of modern-day Qingdao. The conflict was part of the Jin–Song wars, and was fought near Tangdao Island. It was an attempt by the Jin dynasty to invade and conquer the Southern Song dynasty, yet resulted in failure and defeat for the Jin dynasty. The Jin dynasty navy was set on fire by huopao (a type of gunpowder weapon, possibly cannons) and fire arrows, suffering heavy losses. For this battle, the commander of the Song dynasty squadron, Li Bao, faced the opposing commander Zheng Jia, the admiral of the Jin dynasty. On the fate of Zheng Jia, the History of Jin states:

Zheng Jia did not know the sea routes (among the islands) well, nor much about the management of ships, and he did not believe (that the enemy, the Song, was near). But all of a sudden they appeared, and finding us quite unready they hurled incendiary gunpowder projectiles on to our ships. So seeing all his ships going up in flames, and having no means of escape, Zheng Jia jumped into the sea and drowned.

This battle was followed by another naval confrontation, the Battle of Caishi taking place in 1161. The battle is significant in the technological history of the Song navy. The 20th-century historian Joseph Needham has called the era "one of continual innovation" when the size of the Song fleet grew "from a total of 11 squadrons and 3,000 men [the Song navy] rose in one century to 20 squadrons totalling 52,000 men, with its main base near Shanghai." They were further reinforced by the aid of seafaring Chinese merchants. The technological gains of the Song navy ensured its access and dominance of the East China Sea for centuries in competition with the military forces of Jurchen and Mongol rivals. By 1129, the Song navy had invented gunpowder bombs for warship trebuchets. The weapon was made mandatory for all ships in the Song fleet. The construction of paddle-wheel ships, operated with treadmills, went on for several decades between 1132 and 1183. The engineer Gao Xuan devised a paddle-wheel ship outfitted with up to eleven paddle-wheels on each side. Iron plating for armoring the ships was designed in 1203 by the engineer Qin Shifu.

Li Bao ordered his men to hurl their huopao (rudimentary grenades) and to concentrate the fire of their incendiary arrows and rockets at the rigging of the enemy ships. The Jin officers were taken by surprise by the impetuosity of the Chinese attack. The crimson sails of their ships made of oiled silk caught fire, and as the ships began to burn, the panic-stricken crew and soldiers leaped into the sea. While many Jin ships surrendered when the Chinese vessels closed in on them, others which were moored farther away hurriedly raised anchor and hoisted sail to flee.

— Jung-pang Lo

== See also ==
- Naval history of China
- Military history of China (pre-1911)
- Timeline of the Jin–Song wars
- History of the Song dynasty
- Technology of the Song dynasty
- Gunpowder warfare
- Jiao Yu
