= Bada =

Bada may refer to:

== Education ==
- Bay Area Digital Arts or BADA, a school of digital arts in California, US
- British American Drama Academy or BADA, a theatre school in Britain

== People ==
- Bada (singer) (born 1980), South Korean singer
- Jeffrey L. Bada (born 1942), American chemical evolutionist
- Kim Bada (born 1971), South Korean rock musician
- Sunday Bada (born 1969), Nigerian sprinter

== Places ==
- Bada (crater), a crater on Mars named after the village
- Bada (rural locality), a rural locality (selo) in Zabaykalsky Krai, Russia
  - Bada (air base), an air base near the village
- Hobicha Bada, an administrative town of Hobicha district, Wolayita Zone, Ethiopia
- Bada, Davangere, a village in Davangere district, Karnataka, India
- Bada, a village on Minicoy island, India

== Other uses ==
- Bada (operating system), a mobile smartphone operating system developed by Samsung
- Bada', a Shi'a Muslim concept of alteration in the divine will
- Bada language, Sulawesi, Indonesia
- Bada language (Nigeria)
- British Antique Dealers' Association (BADA)

== See also ==
- Badas (disambiguation)
