= Badas =

Badas may refer to:

== Places ==
- Badas Forest Reserve in Belait District, Brunei
- Badas (Inam), a village in Karnataka, India
- Badas (K.H.), a village in Karnataka, India
- Badas, Kediri, a kecamatan (district) in Kediri Regency, Indonesia
- Badas Islands, a group of islands in Bintan Regency, Indonesia

== Other uses ==
- Bowel-associated dermatosis–arthritis syndrome or BADAS
- Kostas Badas (born 1976), Greek footballer

== See also ==
- Bada (disambiguation) for the singular of Badas
- Badass (disambiguation)
