= List of wars involving the Mughal Empire =

The Mughal Empire was an early modern empire that dominated the Indian subcontinent between 1526 and 1857 and fought a series of wars with neighbouring empires and kingdoms. The following is a list of wars involving the Mughal empire:

== List ==
- Mughal–Rajput Wars (1526–1779)
- Mughal–Afghan Wars (1526–1752)
- Mughal–Persian Wars (1605–1739)
- Mughal–Ahom Wars (1616–1682)
- Mughal–Danish East India Company Wars (1642–1698)
- Mughal–Tibet Wars (1679–1684)
- Mughal–Maratha Wars (1680–1707)
- Mughal–British East India Company Wars (1686–1857)
- Mughal Civil Wars (1627–1720)

== See also ==
- List of battles involving the Mughal Empire
- Anglo-Mughal War
