= Bad Ass Bitch =

Bad Ass Bitch, Badass Bitch, and Bad-ass Bitch may refer to:

== Music ==
=== Albums ===
- Bad Ass Bitch, an EP release by the SKG vocal trance project
- Bad-Ass Bitch N' Roll, an EP release by the Löske Swedish punk project

=== Tracks ===
- "Bad Ass Bitch", a 1989 2 Live Crew track from As Nasty As They Wanna Be
- "Bad Ass Bitch", a 1990 Choice track from The Big Payback
- "Bad Ass Bitch", a 1999 Lunachicks track from Luxury Problem
- "Bad Ass Bitch", a 2002 Coo Coo Cal track from Still Walkin'

== See also ==
- Badass (disambiguation)
- Bad bitch
- Bitch (insult)
- Bitchin'
