= Bada (Wolaita) =

Town in Wolaita, Ethiopia

Bada: Hobbicha Baddaa Ambbaa (Wolaytta); ሆቢቻ ባዳ (Amharic); Hobicha Bada
- Town
- Location within Ethiopia
- Coordinates: 6°46′48″N 37°49′47″E
- Country: Ethiopia
- Region: South Ethiopia Regional State
- Zone: Wolaita
- District: Hobicha
- Elevation: 1,800 m (5,900 ft)
- Time zone: UTC+3 (East Africa Time)
- Geocode: S -30

Bada (Amharic: ባዳ) or Hobicha Bada (Amharic: ሆቢቻ ባዳ) is a town in Wolaita, Ethiopia. Bada is an administrative capital of Hobicha woreda of Wolayita Zone. Bada town is located at a distance of 18 km away to the direction of North from Abala Abaya, 22 km away to the direction of South from Damot Weyde, 27 km away to the direction of Northwest from Sidama Region (specially Loka Abaya woreda), 18 km away to the direction of Southeast from Sodo Zuria woreda, 21 km South east from Humbo woreda.

The amenities in the town are; electricity, public water, banks, primary and secondary schools, postal service, telecommunications services health centre, private clinics, drugs store, public market, public road light around high ways and others. Latitudinal and longitudinal location of Bada town is 6° 46' 48" N and 37° 49' 47" E respectively as elevation of 1,800 meters.
