= Faracho =

Town in Wolaita, Ethiopia

Abala Paracho: Paarachcho (Wolaytta); ፓራቾ (Amharic)
- Town
- Paracho
- Location within Ethiopia
- Coordinates: 6°37′57″N 37°50′04″E
- Country: Ethiopia
- Region: South Ethiopia Regional State
- Zone: Wolaita
- District: Abala Abaya
- Elevation: 1,378 m (4,521 ft)
- Time zone: UTC+3 (EAT)

Faracho or Paracho (Geʽez: ፓራቾ) sometimes called Abala Paracho is a town in Wolayita Zone, South Ethiopia Regional State, Ethiopia. The town is an administrative center of Abala Abaya district of Wolayita Zone, Ethiopia. Paracho is located about 349 km (217 mi) away from Addis Ababa to the south and also 30 km (19 mi) away from Wolaita Sodo to the South, the capital of Wolaita Zone. The amenities in the town are, 24 hours electricity, pure public water, banks, schools, postal service, telecommunications services and others. Paracho lies between 6°55'0" N and 37°39'0" E. The town is located at an elevation of 1,378 meters (4,521 ft) above sea level.

== Climate ==
Paracho receives annual rainfall of 50 to 300 mm (2.0 to 11.8 in). The monthly mean maximum temperature of the area is 32 °C (90 °F), while its minimum temperature is 15.5 °C (59.9 °F). The soil type of the town is silty clay.
