= Badass (book) =

2009 book by Ben Thompson

- Author: Ben Thompson
- Language: English
- Subject: historical figures biography
- Genre: history, humor
- Publication date: October 27, 2009
- Publication place: United States
- Pages: 352
- ISBN: 0-06-174944-3

Badass: A Relentless Onslaught of the Toughest Warlords, Vikings, Samurai, Pirates, Gunfighters, and Military Commanders to Ever Live, also known as Badass: The Book, is a history and biography book. It is the debut book of Ben Thompson, owner of the website Badass of The Week.

The book focuses on historical figures considered to be badass: having exceptional toughness, aggressiveness, battle skills and/or resilience, and have a significant achievement or impact on history. Thompson has stated in an interview that he intended to convey history in the language of youth, so that they feel like "reading something [they're] not supposed to, but ... actually learning something."

== Content ==
The book has 40 historical figures organized in chronological order through four major time periods: Antiquity, the Middle Ages, the Age of Gunpowder, and the Modern Era. Some of the figures are:

- Ramesses II
- Leonidas
- Xenophon
- Alexander the Great
- Chandragupta Maurya
- Emperor Gaozu
- Julius Caesar
- Surena
- Julia Agrippina
- Alaric I
- Khalid bin Walid
- Charles Martel
- Ulf the Quarrelsome
- William the Conqueror
- Harald Hardrada
- Tomoe Gozen
- Genghis Khan
- Vlad the Impaler
- Miyamoto Musashi
- Blackbeard
- Anne Bonny
- Peter Francisco
- Horatio Nelson
- Napoleon Bonaparte
- Agustina of Aragon
- Bass Reeves
- Nikola Tesla
- Manfred Von Richthofen
- Henry Johnson (World War I soldier)
- Eliot Ness
- Irina Sebrova
- Jack Churchill
- General George S. Patton
- Carlos Hathcock
- Bruce Lee
- Yonatan Netanyahu

There are also additional features such as a list of "Badass Marines" and a feature on "Awesome Things You Can Shoot Out of a Catapult." The illustrations are done by several artists that have done work for Wizards of the Coast, White Wolf, and DC Comics. Steven Belledin provided cover art for the book.
