= Badass =

Badass or bad ass may refer to:

A quality of personality or behavior inspiring fear, awe and respect; see masculinity, toughness and macho.

== Entertainment ==
- Badass (book), a 2009 book by Ben Thompson
- Badass (guitar bridges), a manufacturer of bridges for guitars and basses
- Bad Ass (film), a 2012 film
  - Bad Asses, its 2014 sequel
- Baadasssss!, a 2003 American film by Mario Van Peebles
- B4.Da.$$, an album by American rapper Joey Badass

== Songs ==
- "Bad Ass" (song), by American rapper Kid Ink
- "Badass" (Saliva song)
- "Badass", song by Terry Anderson (musician)
- "Badass", by The Bouncing Souls
- "Badass", song by The Crystal Method from CSII Exclusives EP
- "Badass", song by Kacy Crowley
- "Badass" (October 2003 Ruff Demo), song by Garbage from the Run Baby Run single
- "Badass", by Los Enanitos Verdes
- "Badass", song by Reckless Love
- "Badass", by Matthew Sweet
- Bad Ass, album by Stonewall Jackson
- Badass, song by Anirudh Ravichander on the Leo soundtrack

== See also ==
- Badas (disambiguation)
