= Early modern warfare =

Warfare during the gunpowder era

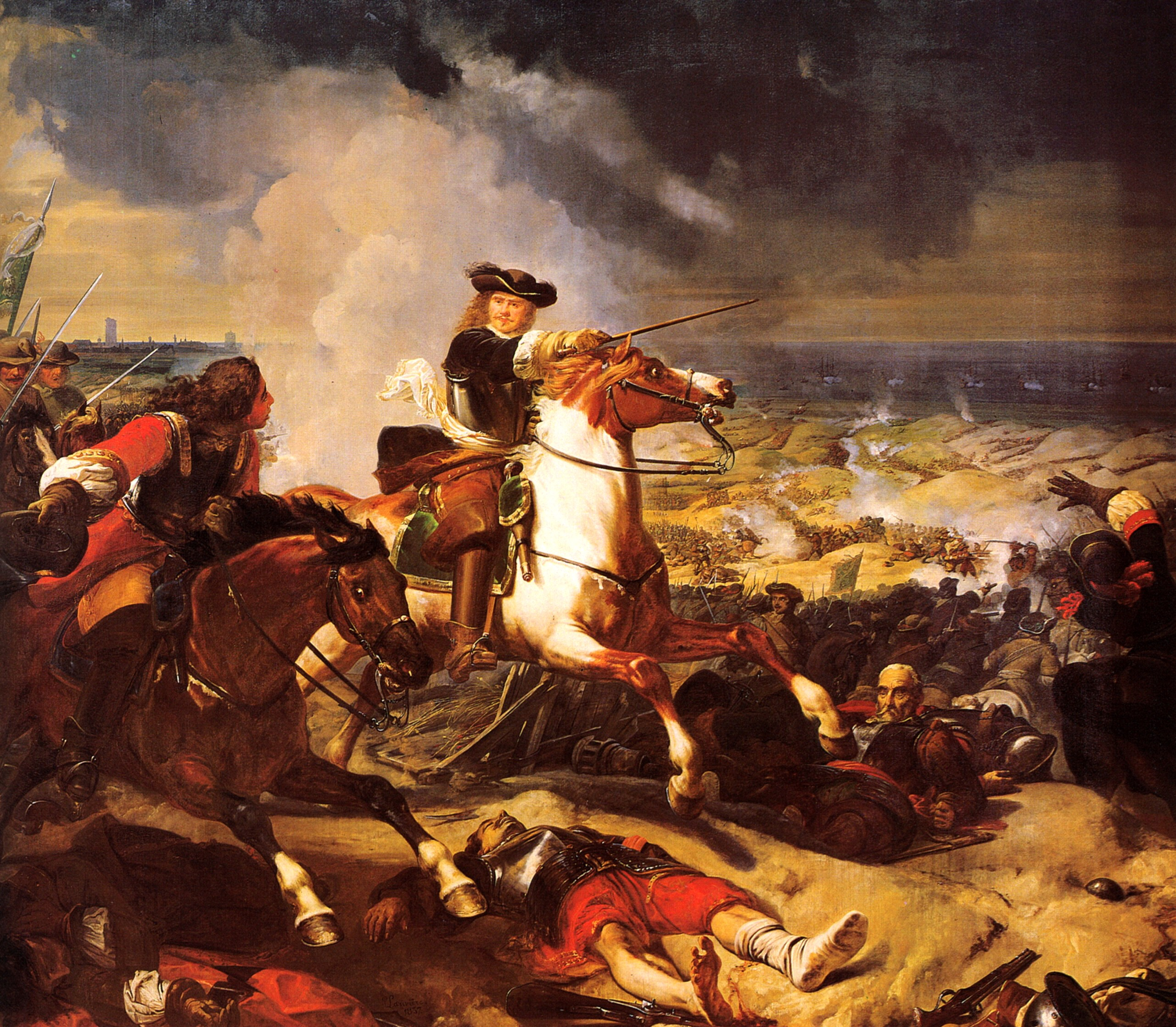
The Battle of the Dunes by Charles-Philippe Larivière, 1837. The Battle of the Dunes was fought on 14 June 1658 at the same time as the Siege of Dunkirk.

Early modern warfare or renaissance warfare is the era of warfare during early modern period and renaissance era following medieval warfare. It is associated with the start of the widespread use of gunpowder and the development of suitable weapons to use the explosive, including artillery and firearms; for this reason the era is also referred to as the age of gunpowder warfare (a concept introduced by Michael Roberts in the 1950s).

Fortification techniques evolved rapidly due to the development of artillery. Firearms revolutionized warfare, diminishing the role of aristocracies and heavy cavalry. Early firearms, like arquebuses and muskets, gradually replaced bows and crossbows, leading to the introduction and decline of plate armour as firearms became more effective. Flintlock muskets became dominant by the 1690s, and the invention of the bayonet combined pikes and muskets, transforming infantry into the most crucial military force. Warfare also saw a shift towards larger armies and more devastating conflicts. The rise of centralized states and bureaucracies supported the new, massive armies, while the use of mercenaries declined. Military formations adapted to these changes. Infantry relied on columns, lines, and squares for battle, while cavalry transitioned to lighter roles focused on scouting and flanking. Despite the decline in heavy cavalry's dominance, cavalry charges remained effective under specific conditions, particularly against undisciplined infantry. The Age of Sail (usually dated as 1571–1862) was a period roughly corresponding to the early modern period and gunpowder dominated the era's naval tactics, including the use of gunpowder in naval artillery.

Wars became longer and more destructive, often causing widespread civilian suffering:

- In Africa, the Horn of Africa, the Adal's conquest of Ethiopia involving the Ottomans, Mamluks and the Portuguese, the First and Second Boer War, and the Anglo-Zulu War.
- In Americas, the American Indian Wars, Platine Wars, and Spanish American wars of independence.
- In Asia, the Persia–Portugal war, the Japanese invasions of Korea (1592–1598), the Anglo-Mughal War, the Anglo-Mysore wars, Anglo-Sikh War, Nader's Campaigns, Taiping Rebellion, and China's Transition from Ming to Qing followed by the Ten Great Campaigns.
- All of the Great Powers of Europe and the Islamic gunpowder empires were actively fighting numerous wars throughout this period, grouped in rough geographical and chronological terms as:
  - The European wars of religion between the 1520s and the 1640s (including the Thirty Years' War, the Nine Years’ War, the Eighty Years' War, the English Civil War, and the Wars of the Three Kingdoms) and, the Franco-Spanish War (1635–1659), the Northern Wars, Polish–Swedish wars and Russo-Swedish Wars.
  - The Italian Wars, Russo-Turkish wars, Ottoman–Habsburg wars, Ottoman Civil War (1509–1513), and other Ottoman wars in Europe.
  - Throughout the 18th century the "Second Hundred Years' War", an umbrella term which includes the Seven Years' War, War of the Spanish Succession, War of the Austrian Succession, American Revolutionary War, and Coalition Wars (French Revolutionary Wars and Napoleonic Wars) of the late 18th to early 19th centuries which mark the end of this era.

== Europe ==
In Europe, Medieval castles were replaced by the "Italian style" fortresses, known for low, thick, sloping walls and star-shaped designs with bastions. However, by the mid-18th century, polygonal forts emerged to counter the power of explosive shells.

=== Fortifications ===
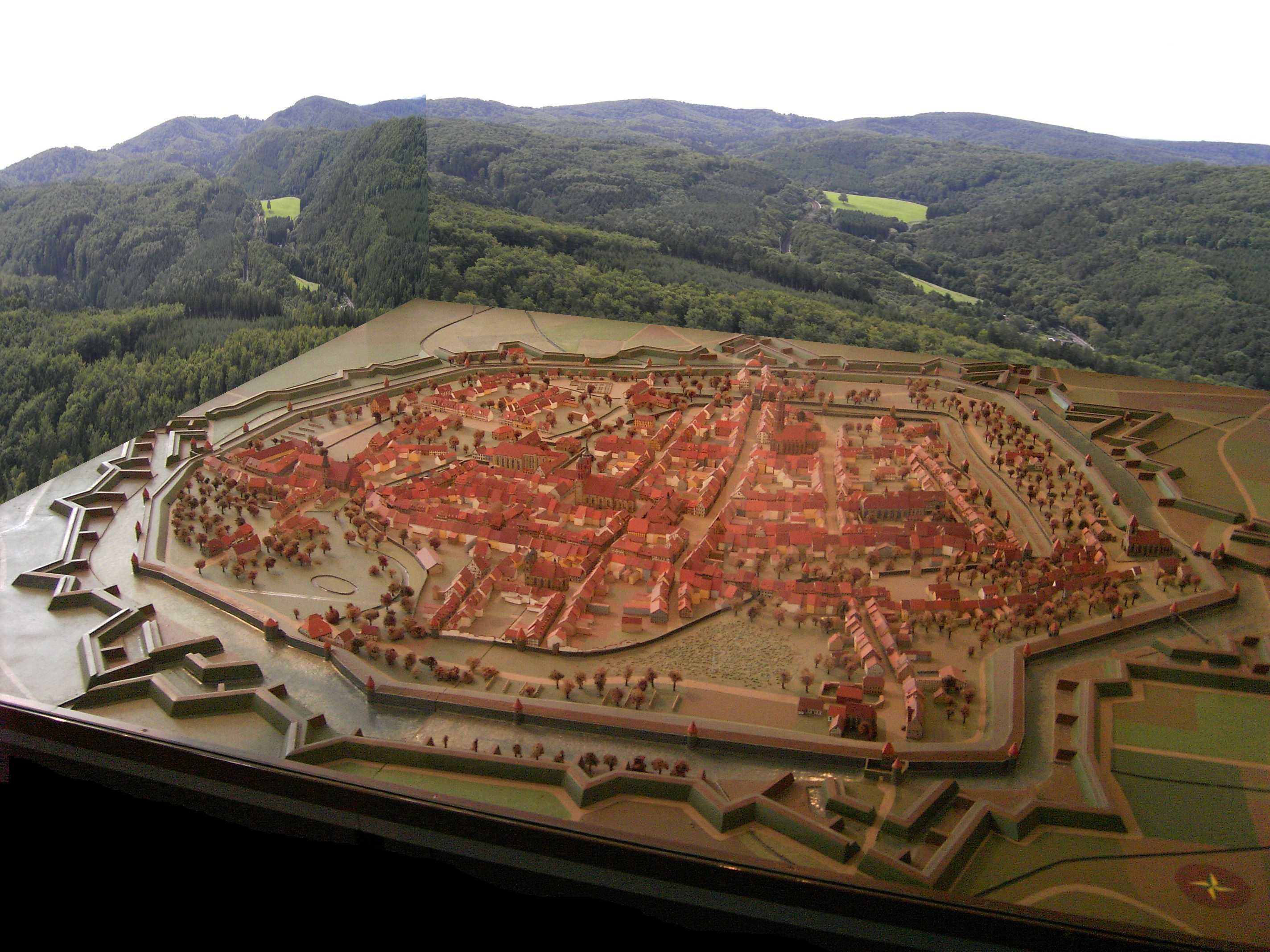
Model of city with polygonal fortifications

The period from 1501 to 1800 saw a rapid advance in techniques of fortification in Europe. Whereas medieval castles had relied on high walls to keep out attackers, early modern fortifications had to withstand artillery bombardments. To do this, engineers developed a style of fortress known as the "Italian style" or trace Italienne. These had low, thick, sloping walls, that would either absorb or deflect cannon fire.

In addition, they were shaped like stars, with bastions protruding at sharp angles. This was to ensure that every bastion could be supported with fire from an adjacent bastion, leaving no dead ground for an attacker to take cover in. These new fortifications quickly negated the advantages cannon had offered to besiegers.

In response to the vulnerabilities of star forts, military engineers evolved a much simpler but more robust style of fortification. A polygonal fort is a fortification in the style that evolved around the middle of the 18th century, in response to the development of explosive shells. The complex and sophisticated designs of star forts that preceded them were highly effective against cannon assault, but proved much less effective against the more accurate fire of rifled guns and the destructive power of explosive shells. The polygonal style of fortification is also described as a "flankless fort". Many such forts were built in the United Kingdom and British Empire during the government of Lord Palmerston, and so they are also often referred to as Palmerston forts. Fort Tas-Silġ is an example of a British polygonal fort.

=== Firearms ===
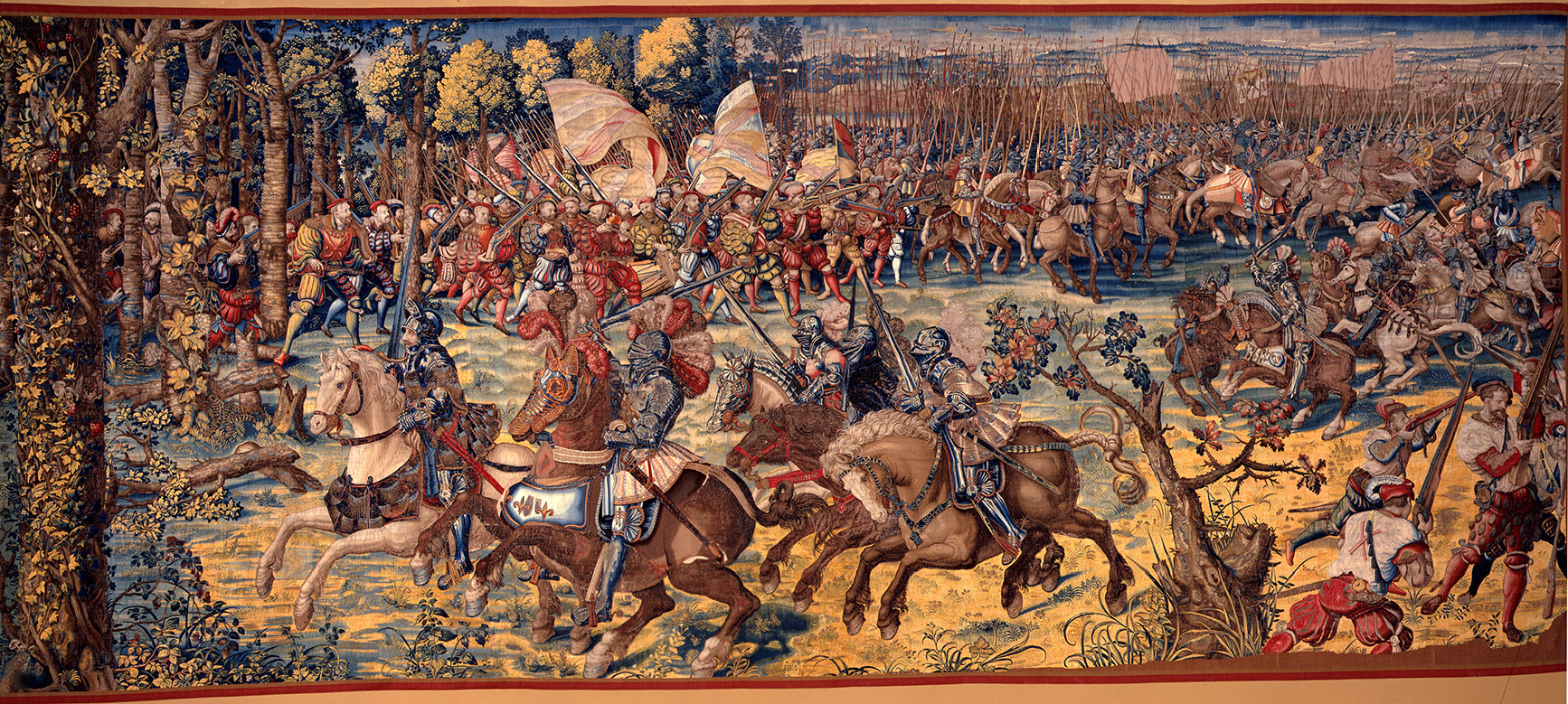
The Battle of Pavia in 1525. Heavy cavalry and Landsknecht mercenaries armed with arquebuses.

The power of aristocracies vis à vis states diminished throughout Western Europe during this period. Aristocrats' 200- to 400-year-old ancestral castles no longer provided useful defences against artillery. The nobility's importance in warfare also eroded as medieval heavy cavalry lost its central role in battle. The heavy cavalry—made up of armoured knights—had begun to fade in importance in the Late Middle Ages. The English longbow and the Swiss pike had both proven their ability to devastate larger armed forces of mounted knights. However, the proper use of the longbow required the user to be extremely strong, making it impossible to amass very large forces of archers.

The proper use of the pike required complex operations in formation and a great deal of fortitude and cohesion by the pikemen, again making amassing large forces difficult. Starting in the early 14th century, armourers added plate-armour pieces to the traditional protective linked mail armour of knights and men-at-arms to guard against the arrows of the longbow and crossbow. By 1415, some infantrymen began deploying the first "hand cannons", and the earliest small-bore arquebuses, with burning "match locks", appeared on the battlefield in the later 15th century.

==== Decline of plate armour ====
Assault on a town, early 17th century

In virtually all major European battles during a period of 200 years (1400 to 1600), many soldiers wore extensive plate armour; this includes infantrymen (usually pikemen) and almost all mounted troops. Plate armour was expected to deflect edged weapons and to stop an arquebus or pistol ball fired from a distance, and it usually did. The use of plate armour as a remedy to firearms tended to work as long as the velocity and weight of the ball remained quite low, but over time the increasing power and effectiveness of firearms overtook the development of defenses to counteract them, such that flintlock muskets (entering use after 1650) could kill an armoured man at a distance of even 100 yards (though with limited accuracy). Thus the amount of armour necessary to protect against this threat would have been heavy and unwieldy.

However, the initial abandonment of plate armor was driven more by financial constraints than by practicality. Prior to the emergence of state-funded armies in the latter half of the 17th century, most early modern forces relied heavily on paid mercenaries. As armies expanded in size and became increasingly centralized, the cost of equipping every soldier with armor, often the most expensive component of their kit, became prohibitive. By the 17th century, most infantry armed with firearms, as well as many pikemen, fought without armor due to these monetary limitations.

Despite the expense of outfitting thousands of soldiers in full plate, cavalry units largely retained their armor during this period. This persistence can be attributed to several factors, including their higher socio-economic status, mobility advantages conferred by horses, and the continued importance of close-quarters fighting. Melee brawls remained a defining feature of cavalry combat well into the mid-19th century, preserving the value of plate armor within cavalry ranks long after it had disappeared from infantry use.

The flintlock musket, carried by most infantrymen other than pikemen after 1650, fired a heavier charge and ball than the matchlock arquebus. A recruit could be trained to use a musket in a matter of weeks. Operating a musket did not require the great physical strength of a pikeman or a longbowman or the fairly rare skills of a horseman. Since a firearm requires little training to operate, a peasant with a gun could now undermine the order and respect maintained by mounted cavalry in Europe and their Eastern equivalents. Although well-smithed armour could still prevent the penetration of gunpowder-weapons, plate armour as a whole was no longer a feasible solution to flintlock firearms. By the end of the 17th century, soldiers in the infantry and most cavalry units alike preferred the higher mobility of being completely unarmoured to the increased protection, but greatly lessened mobility, offered by donning the heavy plate armour of the period.

==== Transition to flintlock muskets ====
The arquebus, in use from 1410, was one of the first handheld firearms that were relatively light (it still required a stand to balance on) and a single person could operate one. One of these weapons was first recorded as being used in the Battle of Agincourt in 1415, although this was still very much a medieval battle. The term musket originally applied to a heavier form of the arquebus, which fired a shot that could pierce plate armour, though only at close range. In the 16th century it still had to be mounted on a support stick to keep it steady. The caliver was the lighter form of the arquebus. By 1600, armies phased out these firearms in favour of a new lighter matchlock musket. Throughout the 16th century and up until 1690, muskets used the matchlock design.

However, the matchlock design was superseded in the 1690s by the flintlock musket, which was less prone to misfires and had a faster reloading rate. By this time, only light-cavalry scouting units, "the eyes of the army", continued to wear front and back armour plates to protect themselves from distant or undisciplined musket-equipped troops.

While soldiers armed with firearms could inflict great damage on cavalry at a moderate distance, at close quarters the cavalry could slaughter the musket-armed infantry if they could break their formation and close to engage in melee combat. For many years infantry formations included a mix of troops armed with both firearms to provide striking power and pikes to allow for the defence of the arquebusiers or musketeers from a cavalry charge. The invention of the bayonet allowed the combining of these two weapons into one in the 1690s, which transformed the infantry into the most important branch of the early modern military—one that uniformly used flintlock muskets tipped with bayonets.

=== Nature of war ===
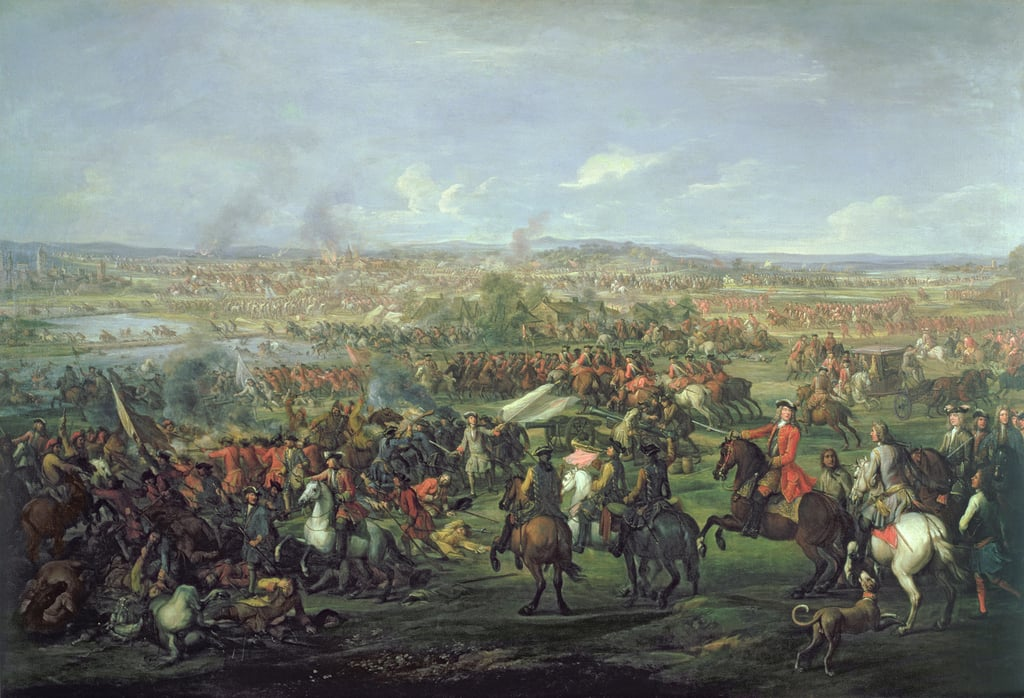
Clash between Anglo-Austrian and French-Bavarian troops in the Battle of Blenheim, 1704

This period saw the size and scale of warfare greatly increase. The number of combatants involved escalated steadily from the mid 16th century and dramatically expanded after the 1660s. For example, Henry II of France, even in the dawn of religious unrest and inevitable violence, could amass an impressive 20,000 men in total for his 1550 decade of war against Habsburg Spain, but Louis XIV, Sun King with the highest population in the Kingdom of France and by extension Western Europe could deploy up to 500,000 men into the field by 1700 in the War of the Spanish Succession with more at stake. Moreover, wars and subsequent battles became increasingly deadly and pyrrhic in this period. The Battle of Fontenoy with advanced presence of Louis XV saw over 100,000 men deployed on both sides ending 20,000 lives, almost half of which were French, and despite a French victory, France herself did not keep Dutch territory gained as peace was desired for the bankrupt kingdom, a layman translation meaning almost 10,000 deaths were rendered obsolete by said king who witnessed the horrors from afar just 3 years later with very few battles left in the Austrian conflict. Cities that took months to siege could fall in mere days. European monarchs with bitter rivalries would invest many resources into intense warfare which often resulted in mass death and destruction of innocent populations, such as the Sack of Rome where the Supreme Pontiff's life was endangered, a symbolic attack against God and Christendom. The Italian Wars alone would threaten Europe's very existence. This may in part be attributed to improvements in weapons technology and in the techniques of using it (for example infantry volley fire).

However, the main reason was that armies were now much bigger, but logistical support for them was inadequate. This meant that armies tended to devastate civilian areas in an effort to feed themselves, causing famines and population displacement. This was exacerbated by the increasing length of conflicts, such as the Thirty Years' War and Eighty Years' War, when this period saw the size and scale of warfare greatly increase. The number of combatants involved escalated steadily from the mid 16th century and they fought over areas subjected to repeated devastation. For this reason, the wars of this era were among the most lethal before the modern period.

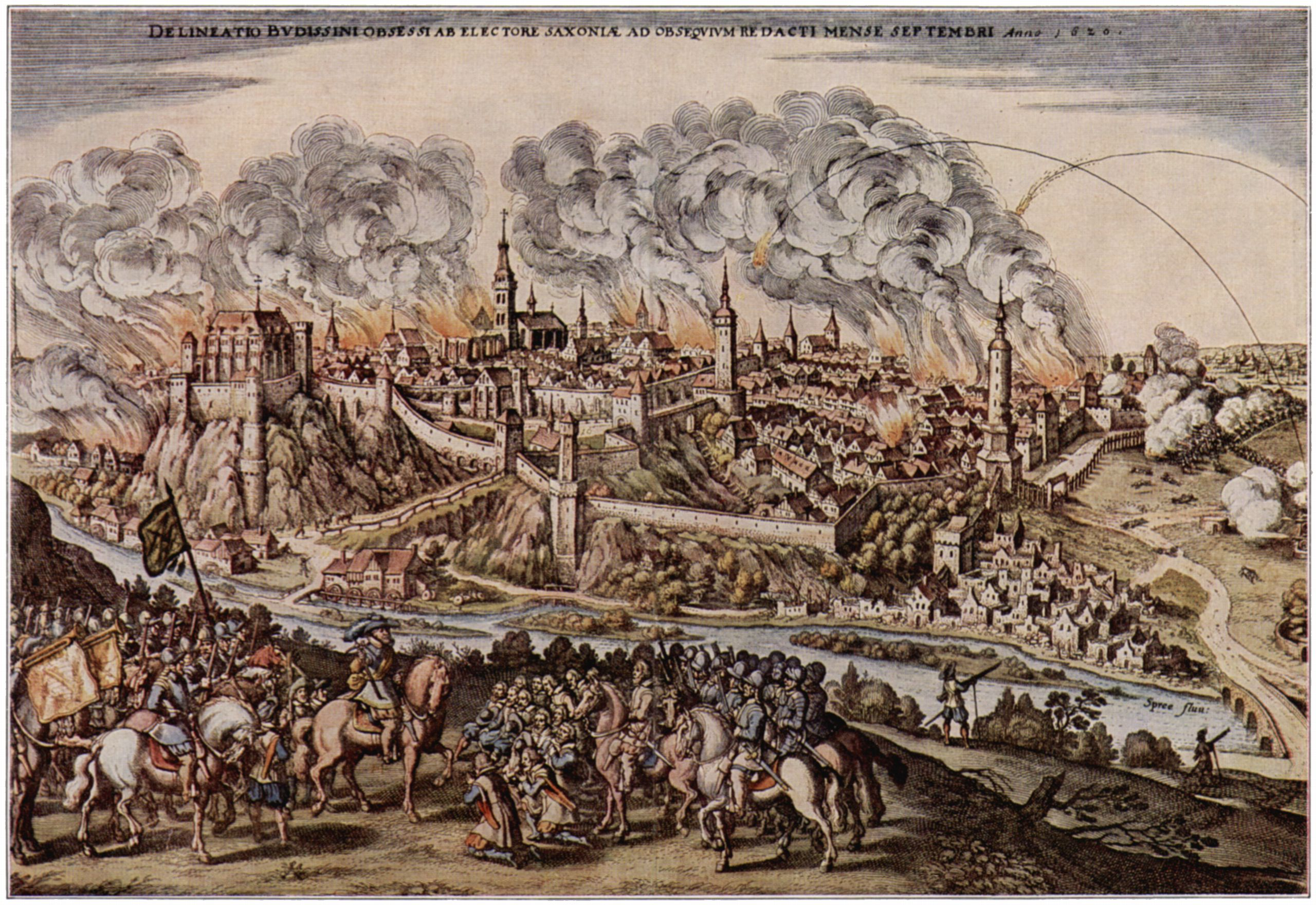
The siege and capture of Bautzen by John George I, Elector of Saxony, in September 1620

For example, the Thirty Years' War and the contemporary Wars of the Three Kingdoms, were the bloodiest conflicts in the history of Germany and Britain respectively before World War I. Another factor adding to bloodshed in war was the lack of a clear set of rules concerning the treatment of prisoners and non-combatants. While prisoners were usually ransomed for money or other prisoners, they were sometimes slaughtered out of hand—as at the Battle of Dungans Hill in 1647.

One of the reasons for warfare's increased impact was its indecisiveness. Armies were slow moving in an era before good roads and canals. Battles were relatively rare as armies could manoeuvre for months, with no direct conflict. In addition, battles were often made irrelevant by the proliferation of advanced, bastioned fortifications. To control an area, armies had to take fortified towns, regardless of whether they defeated their enemies' field armies. As a result, by far the most common battles of the era were sieges, hugely time-consuming and expensive affairs. Storming a fortified city could result in massive casualties and cities which did not surrender before an assault were usually brutally sacked -for example Magdeburg in 1631 or Drogheda in 1649. In addition, both garrisons and besiegers often suffered heavily from disease.

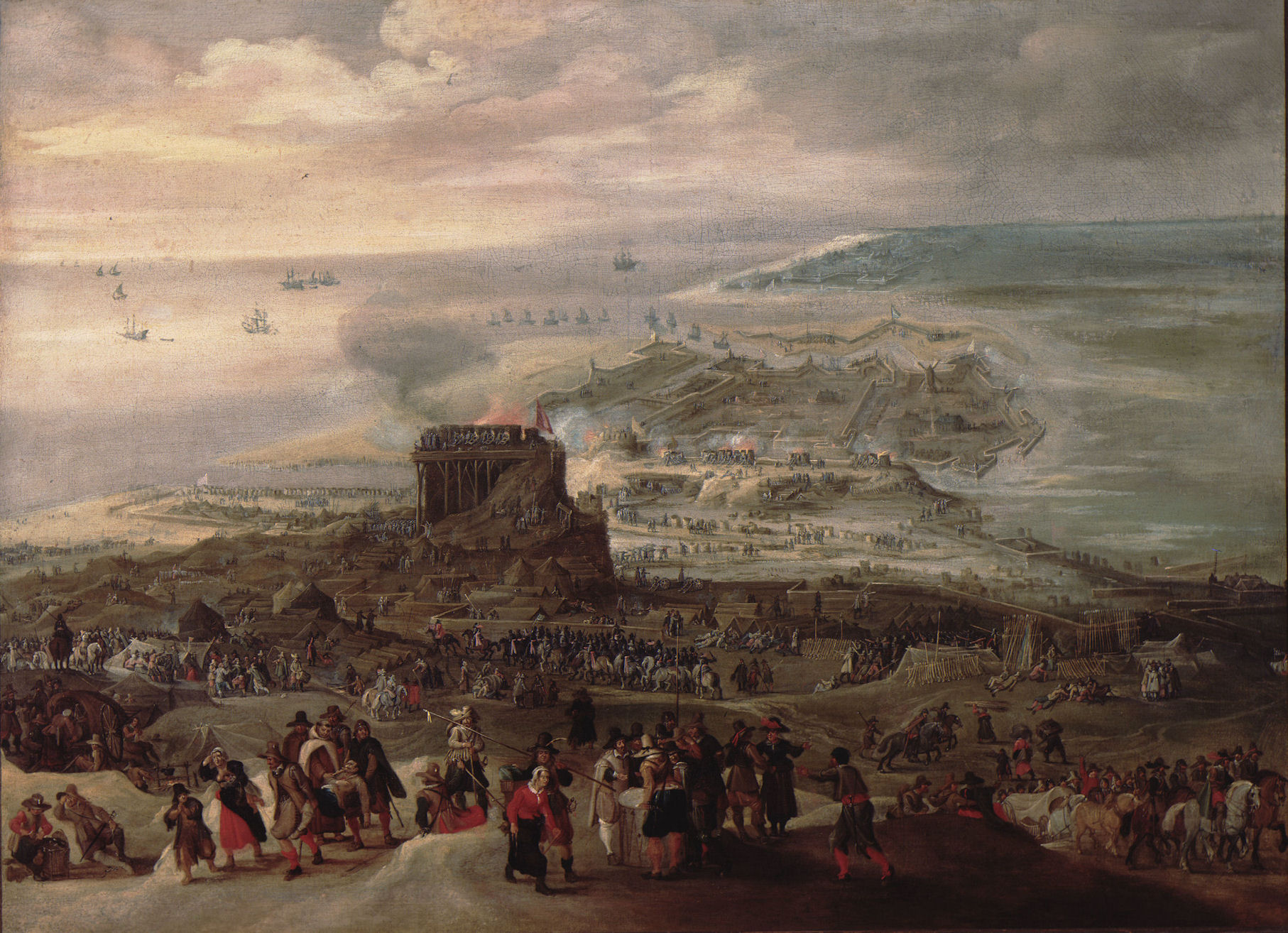
Siege of Ostend in 1601–1604

The indecisive nature of conflict meant wars were long and endemic. Conflicts stretched on for decades and many states spent more years at war than they did at peace. The Spanish attempt to reconquer the Netherlands after the Dutch Revolt became bogged down in endless siege warfare. The expense caused the Spanish monarchy to declare bankruptcy several times, beginning in 1577.

The changes in warfare eventually made the mercenary forces of the Renaissance and Middle Ages obsolete. However this was a gradual change. As late as the Thirty Years' War (1618–1648), most troops were mercenaries. However, after this conflict, most states invested in better disciplined and more ideologically inspired troops. For a time mercenaries became important as trainers and administrators, but soon these tasks were also taken by the state. The massive size of these armies required a large supporting force of administrators. The newly centralized states were forced to set up vast organized bureaucracies to manage these armies, which some historians argue is the basis of the modern bureaucratic state.

The combination of increased taxes and increased centralisation of government functions caused a series of revolts across Europe such as the English Civil War and the Fronde in France. In many countries, the resolution of this conflict was the rise of monarchical absolutism. Only in England and the Netherlands did representative government evolve as an alternative. From the late 17th century, states started financing wars through long term low interest loans from national banking institutions like the Bank of England. The first state to take full advantage of this process was the Dutch Republic.

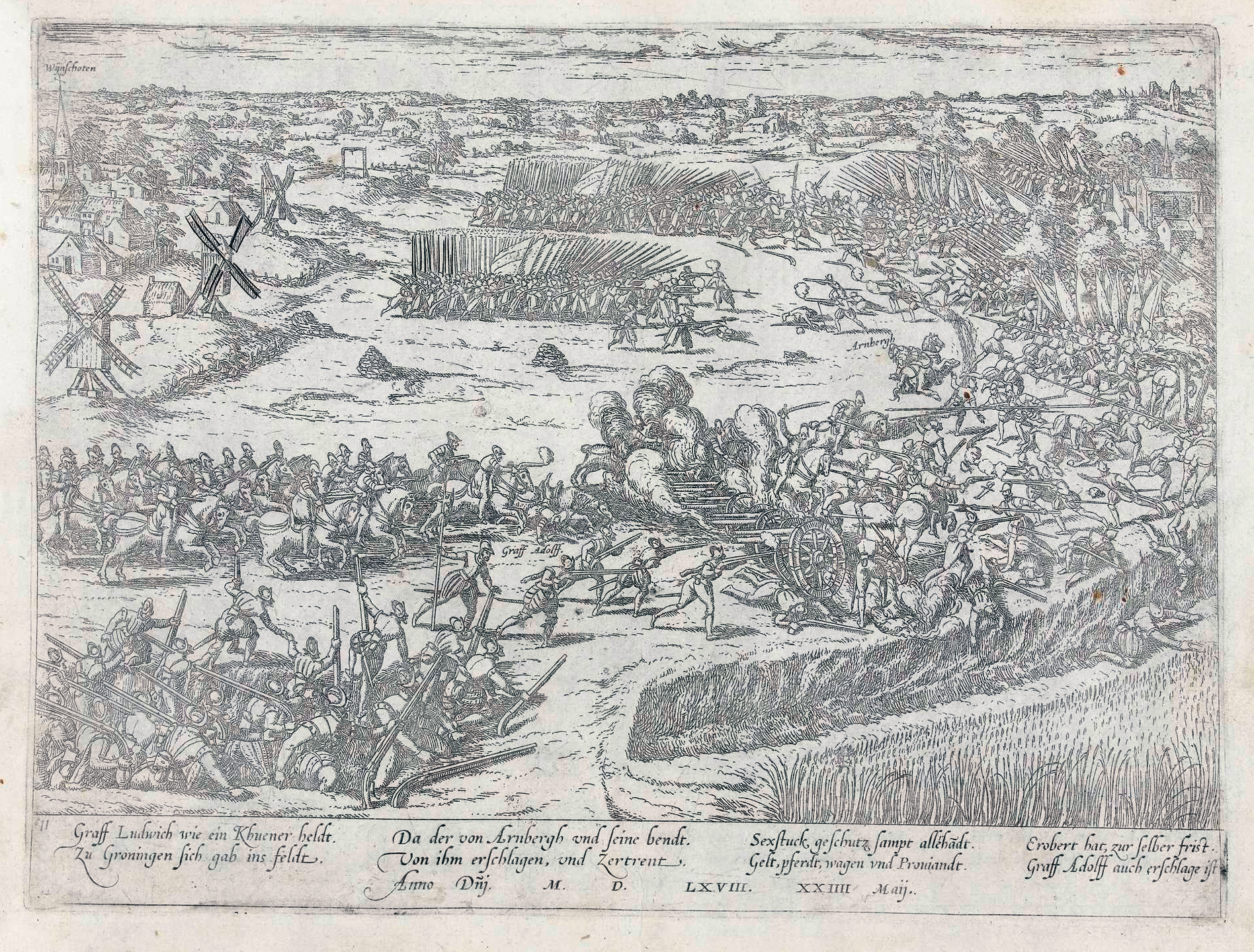
Battle of Heiligerlee in 1568, showing the deployment of artillery, cavalry and infantry bearing pikes and muskets

This transformation in the armies of Europe had great social impact. J. F. C. Fuller famously stated that "the musket made the infantryman and the infantryman made the democrat". This argument states that the defence of the state now rested on the common man, not on the aristocrats. Revolts by the underclass, that had routinely been defeated in the Middle Ages, could now conceivably threaten the power of the state. However, aristocrats continued to monopolise the officer corps of almost all early modern armies, including their high command.

Moreover, popular revolts almost always failed unless they had the support and patronage of the noble or gentry classes. The new armies, because of their vast expense, were also dependent on taxation and the commercial classes who also began to demand a greater role in society. The great commercial powers of the Dutch and English matched much larger states in military might. As any man could be quickly trained in the use of a musket, it became far easier to form massive armies. The inaccuracy of the weapons necessitated large groups of massed soldiers. This led to a rapid swelling of the size of armies.

For the first time huge masses of the population could enter combat, rather than just the highly skilled professionals. It has been argued that the drawing of men from across the nation into an organized corps helped breed national unity and patriotism, and during this period the modern notion of the nation state was born. However, this would only become apparent after the French Revolutionary Wars. At this time, the levée en masse and conscription would become the defining paradigm of modern warfare.

Before then, however, most national armies were in fact composed of many nationalities. For example, although the Swedish Army under Gustavus Adolphus was originally recruited by a kind of national conscription, the losses of the Thirty Years' War meant that by 1648 over 80% of its troops were foreign mercenaries. In Spain, armies were recruited from all the Spanish European territories including Spain, Italy, Wallonia and Germany. The French recruited soldiers from Germany, Switzerland and elsewhere as well as from France. Britain recruited Hessian troops until the late 18th century. Irish Catholics made careers for themselves in the armies of many European states (See the Flight of the Wild Geese).

=== Infantry ===
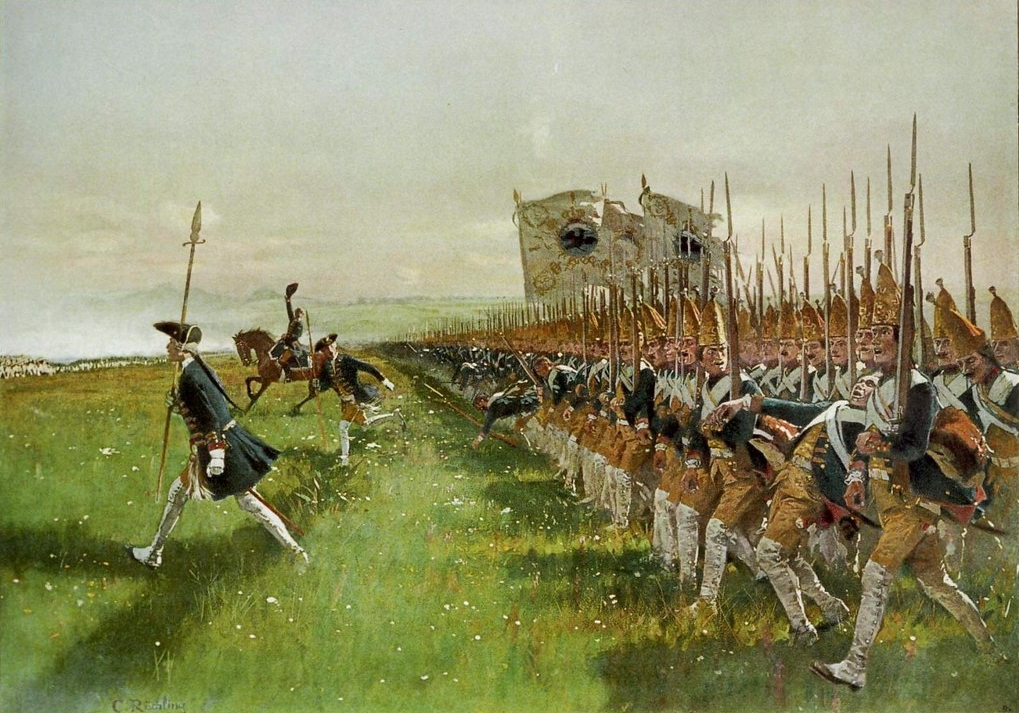
Prussian Infantry attacking in lines during the Battle of Hohenfriedberg

Column – This formation was typically used while marching, although with sufficient will and mass it was effective at breaking through line formations, albeit with heavy casualties.

Line – A simple two- or three-rank deep line formation allowed most muskets to be brought to bear and was the most commonly used battle formation. Often the first rank would kneel after firing to allow the second rank to fire.

Skirmishers – Skirmishers were not a common infantry unit until late in the 18th century. Light infantry would advance and be the first to fire to draw the enemy to attack, while also probing the flanks. In later eras, sharpshooters would not only target common soldiers, but also officers so that the men were without leadership.

Square – This formation was used against cavalry. Bayonets would be fixed, the first line would kneel with their muskets angled upward (much like a pike.) The second and third lines would fire at the cavalry when it came close. This formation was very ineffective when faced with combined cavalry and infantry, or artillery fire in the case of plain squares.

=== Cavalry ===
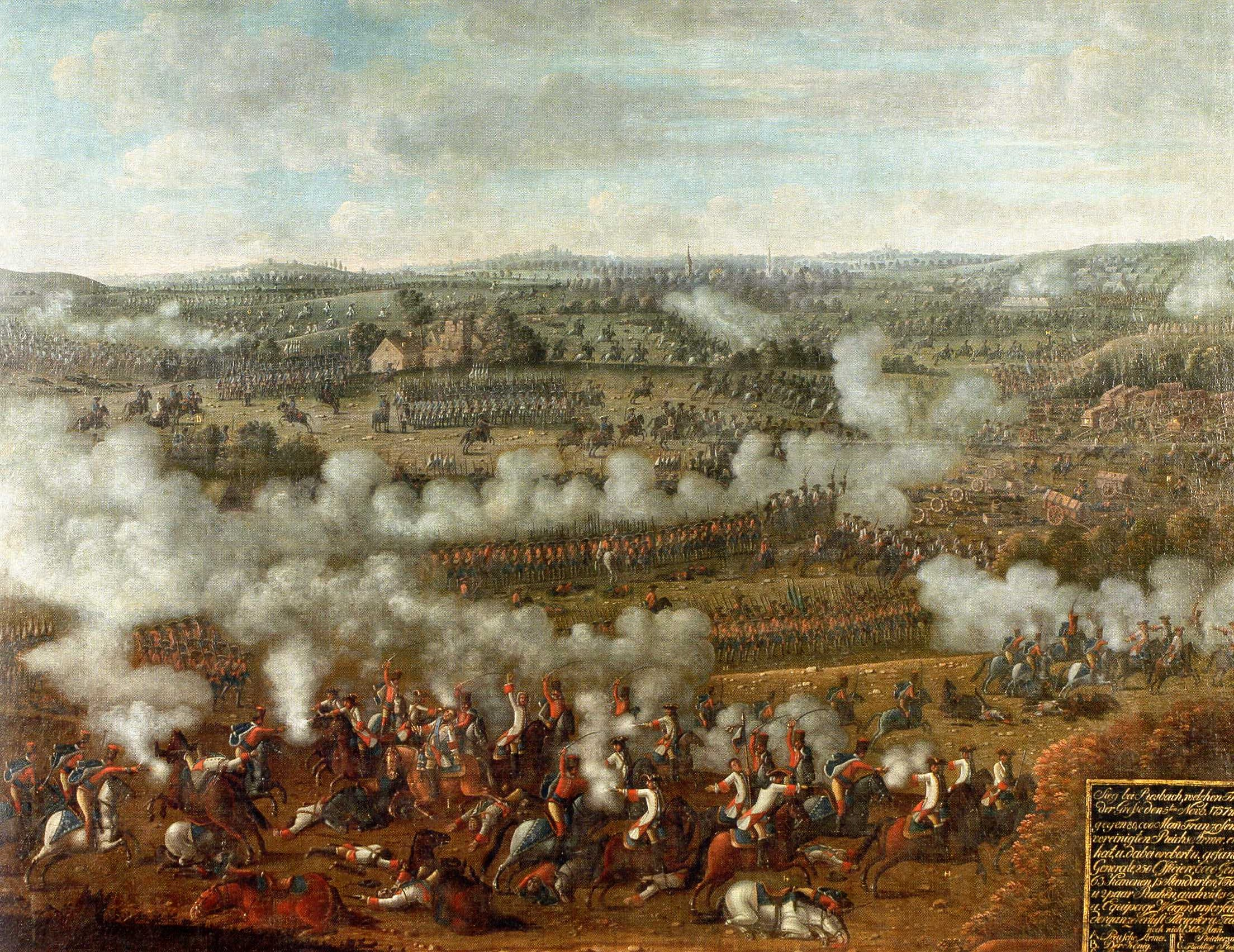
The Battle of Rossbach in Saxony during the Seven Years' War

The rise of gunpowder reduced the importance of the once dominant heavy cavalry, but it remained effective in a new role into the 19th century. Cavalry charges using swords on undisciplined infantry could still be quite decisive, but a frontal charge against well-ordered musketeers and pikemen was all but futile. The cavalry, along with the infantry, became more professional in this period but it retained its greater social and military prestige than the infantry.

In the beginning of the early modern era, heavy cavalry was still dominated by lance wielding men-at-arms, before they were gradually replaced by pistol-armed reiters and cuirassiers, the latter of which continued to see use until World War I. Light cavalry was introduced for skirmishing and scouting because of its advantage in speed and mobility. The new types of cavalry units introduced in this period were the dragoons or mounted infantry. Dragoons were originally intended to travel on horseback but fight on foot and were armed with carbines, pikes, and pistols. Starting in the late 18th century, dragoons gradually lost their role as mounted infantry, serving instead as line cavalry. Even orthodox cavalry carried firearms, especially the pistol, which sometimes they used in a tactic known as the caracole.

Cavalry units, from the 16th century on, were more likely to charge other cavalry on the flanks of an infantry formation and try to work their way behind the enemy infantry. When they achieved this and pursued a fleeing enemy, heavy cavalry could still destroy an enemy army. Only specialised cavalry units like winged hussars armed with long lances could break pikemen lines, but this was rather an exception. By the 1630s, the strategies of military commanders such as Gustavus Adolphus saw the full re-integration of charging into cavalry tactics. The cavalry charge remained an important part of battle tactics for the rest of 17th century and until the modern area, and its shock value could be decisive when implemented properly like during the Battle of Lützen and the Battle of Vienna (1683).

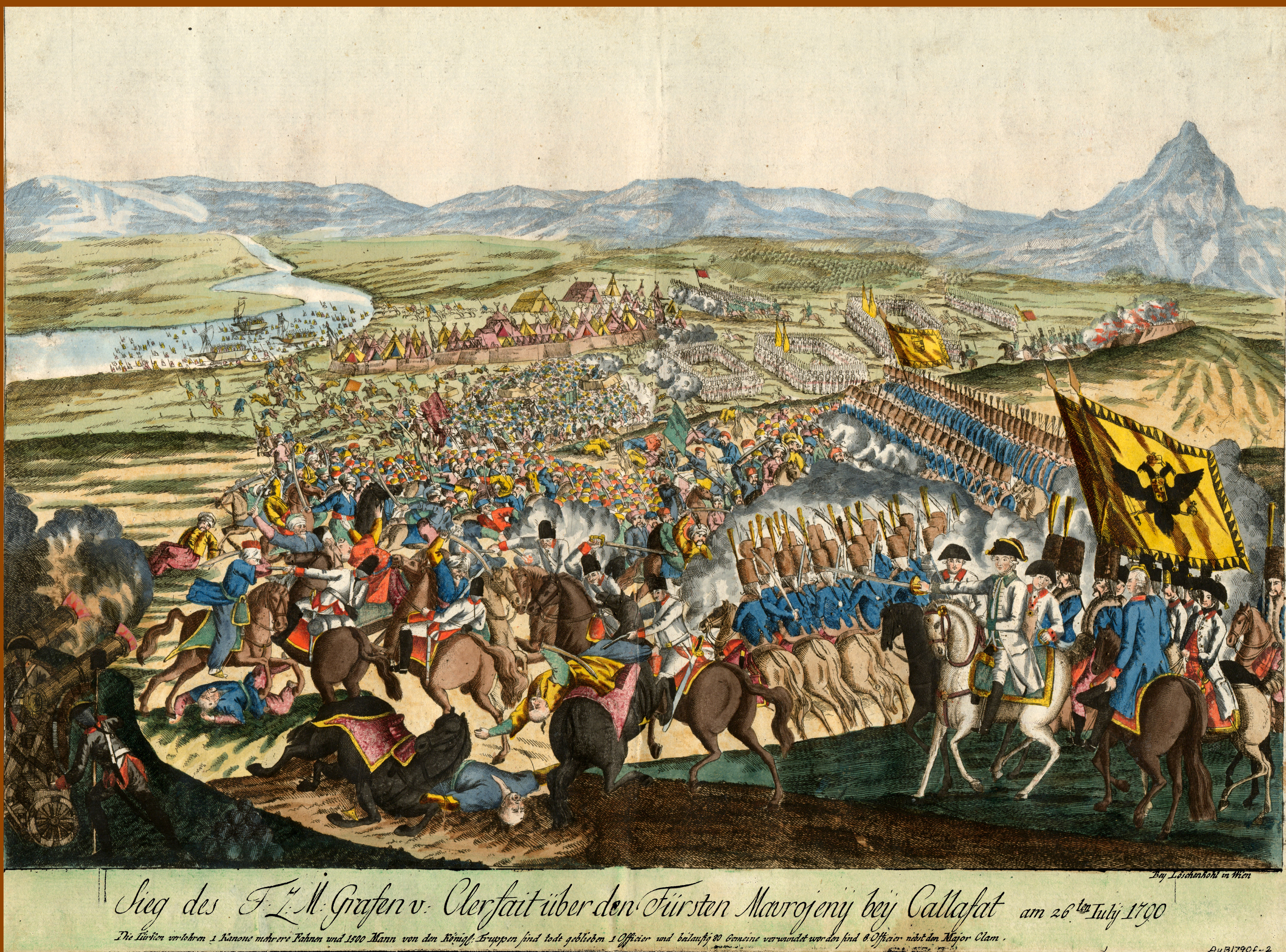
Clash between Austrian and Turkish troops during the Austro-Turkish War, 1790

However, European powers would never again field armies dominated by cavalry. For the first time in millennia, the settled people of the agricultural regions could defeat the horse peoples of the steppe in open combat. The power of the Mongols was broken in Russia and, no longer threatened from the east, Russia began to assert itself as a major force in European affairs. Never again would nomads from the east threaten to overrun Europe or the Middle East. In the Siege of Kazan (1552), Russia had employed artillery, sappers, cavalry and infantry armed with arquebus (Streltsy), while the Khanate of Kazan had only employed cavalry.

The one exception to this was the Ottoman Empire, which had been founded by Turkish horsemen. The Ottomans were some of the first to embrace gunpowder and integrate it into their army. This investment into gunpowder weaponry allowed the Ottoman Empire to rapidly expand in size and influence. By the 18th century, European infantry became well armed and disciplined enough to regularly defeat larger Ottoman forces during the Great Turkish War and Austro-Turkish War.

=== Naval warfare ===
The Age of Sail (usually dated as 1571–1862) was a period roughly corresponding to the early modern period in which international trade and naval warfare were dominated by sailing ships and gunpowder warfare, lasting from the mid-16th to the mid-19th centuries. The spread of European power around the world was closely tied to naval developments in this period. The caravel for the first time made unruly seas like the Atlantic Ocean open to exploration, trade, and military conquest. While in all previous eras, European navies had been largely confined to operations in coastal waters, and were generally used only in a support role for land-based forces, this changed with the introduction of the new vessels like the caravel, carrack, and galleon, and the increasing importance of international waterborne trade in the sixteenth and seventeenth centuries. The new caravels were large enough and powerful enough to be armed with cannons with which they could bombard both shoreline defenses and other vessels.

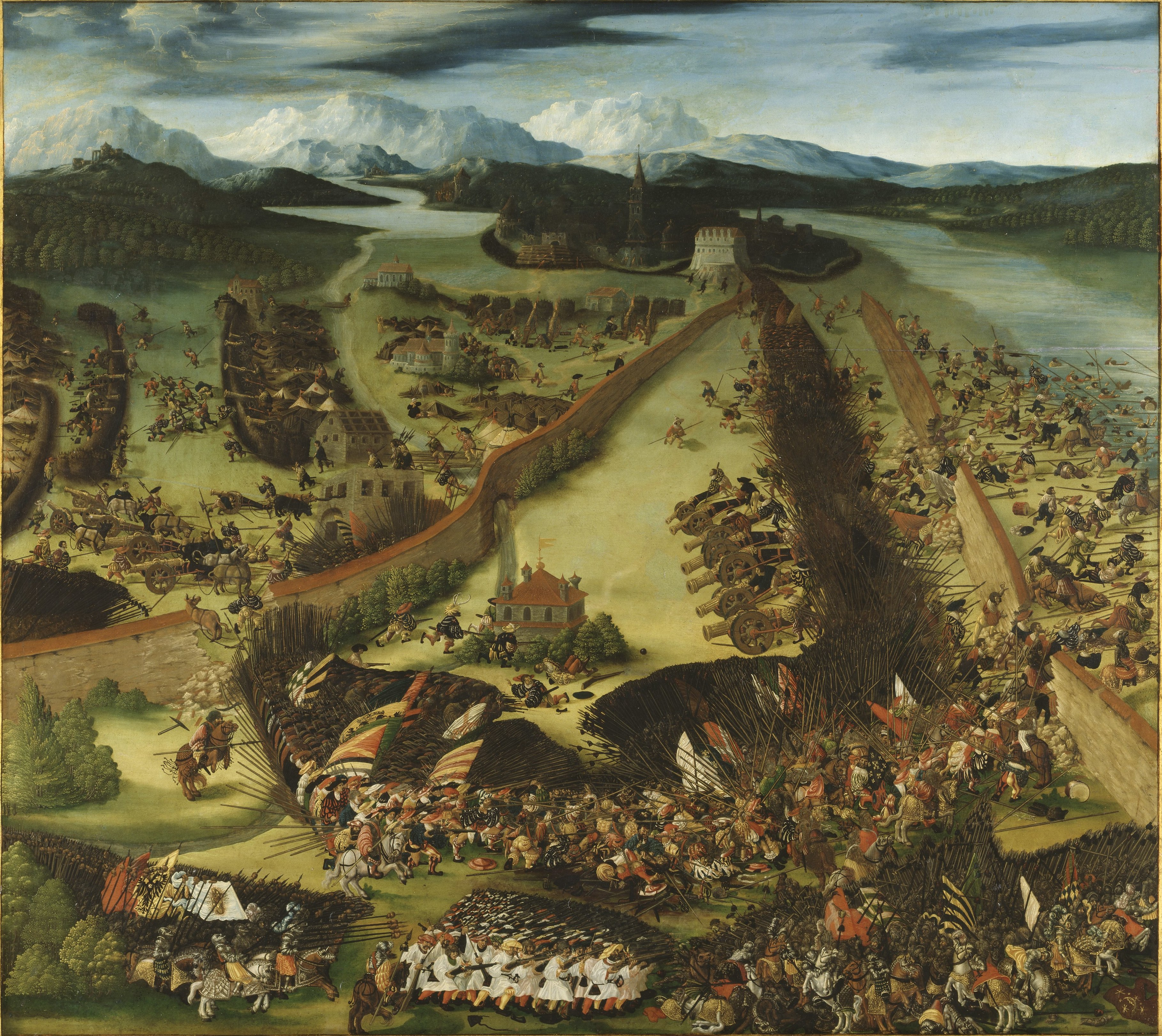
The 1525 Battle of Pavia in Northern Italy.

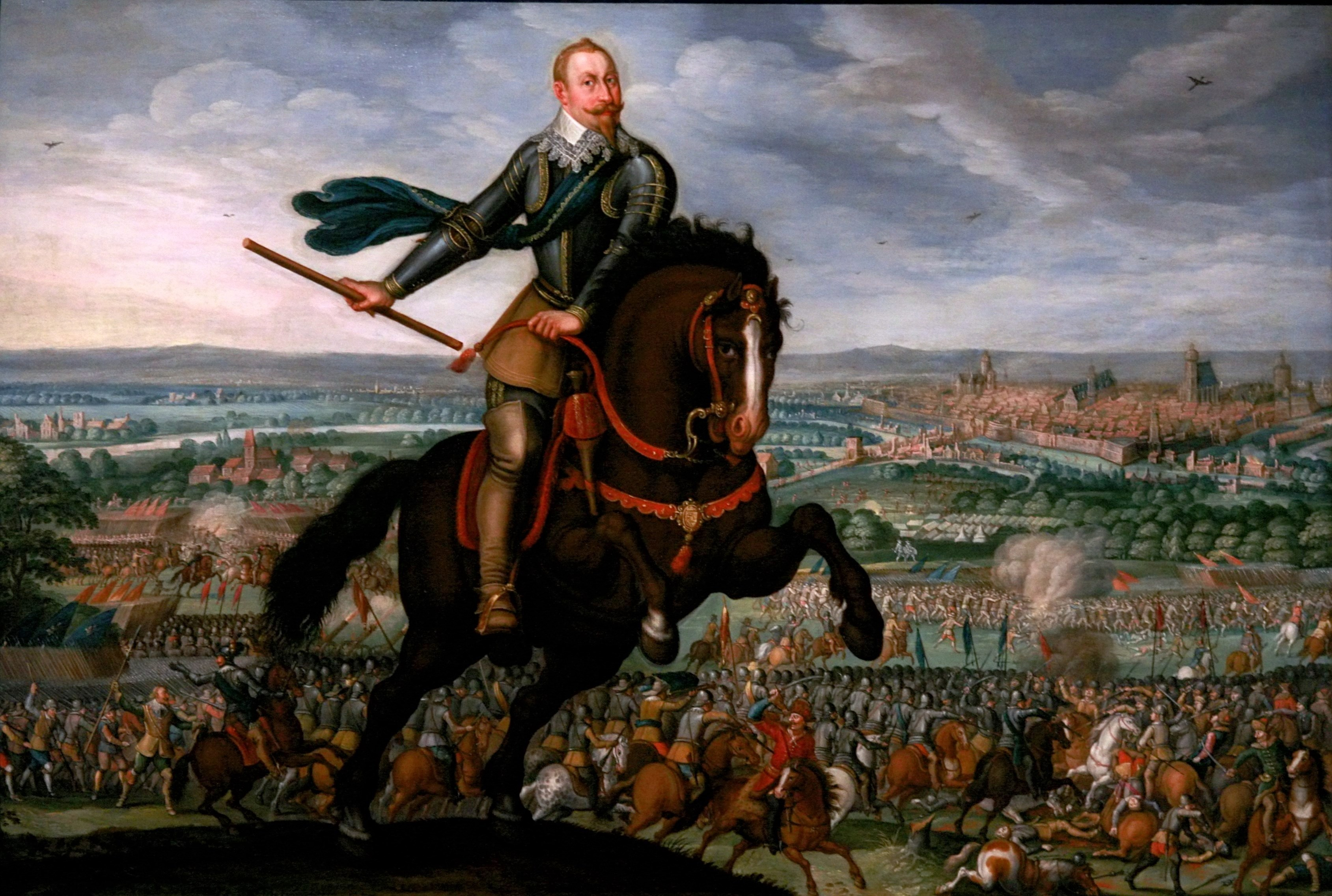
King Gustavus II Adolphus, a great military innovator of the era

The Battle of White Mountain in Bohemia (1620), one of the decisive battles of the Thirty Years War

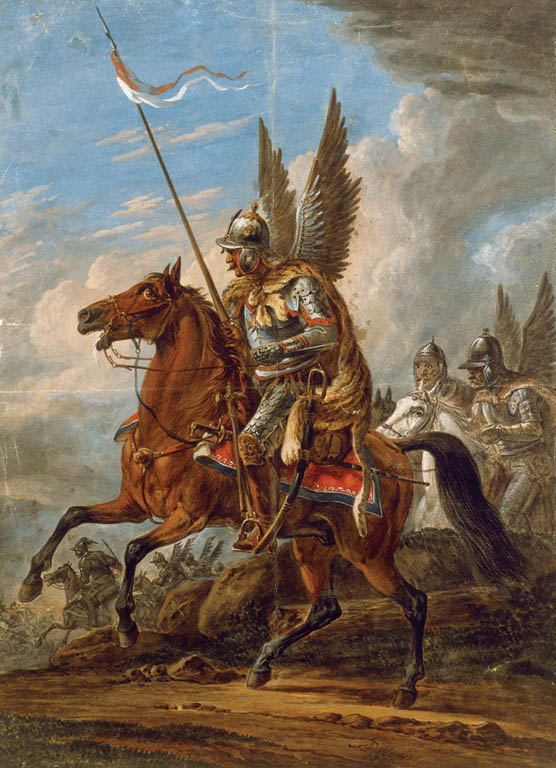
Winged Hussar

The death of King Gustavus II Adolphus in cavalry melee on 16 November 1632 at the Battle of Lützen

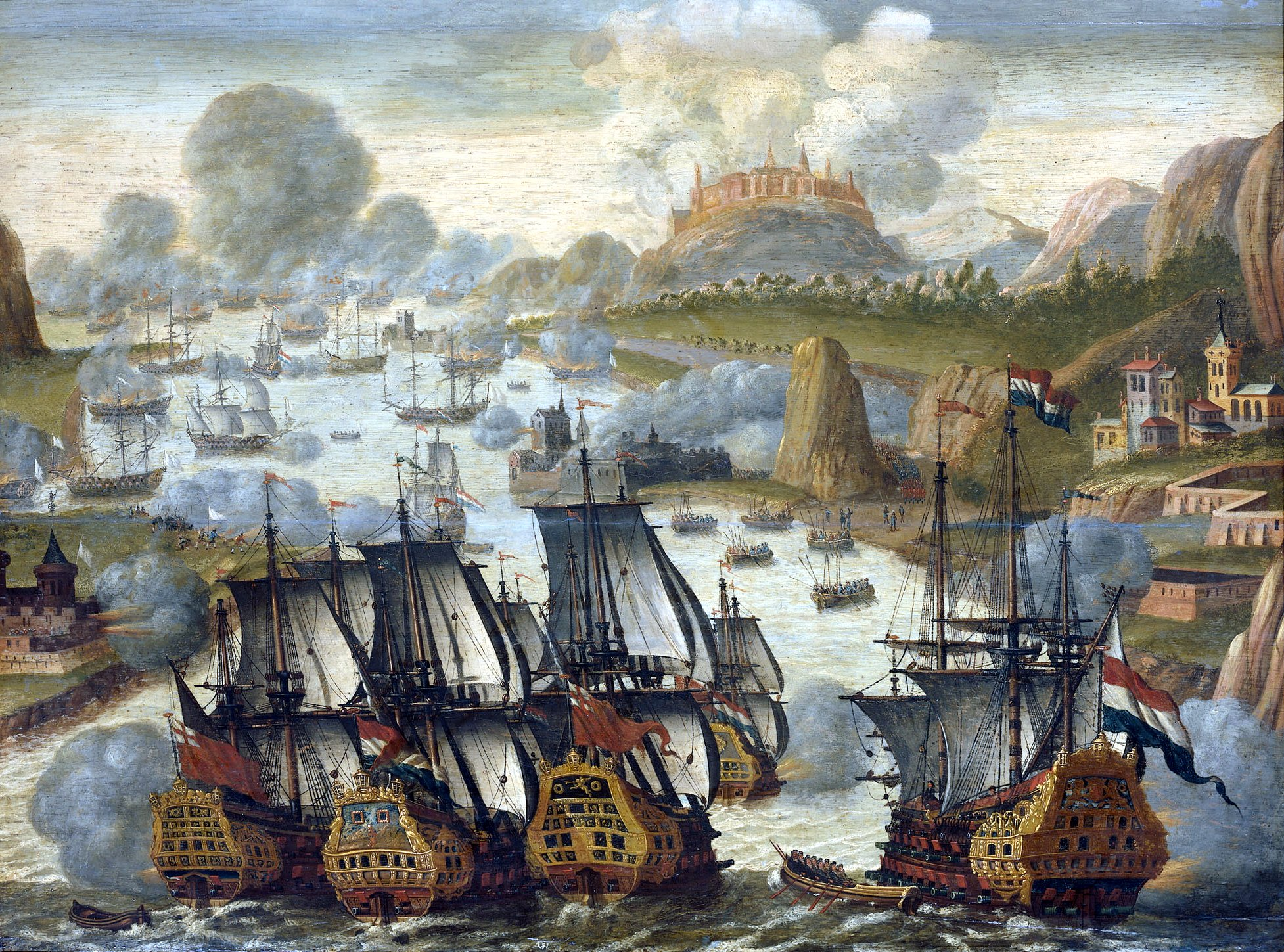
The Battle of Vigo Bay of 1702, part the War of the Spanish Succession (anonymous contemporary painting).

== Africa ==
=== Somalia ===
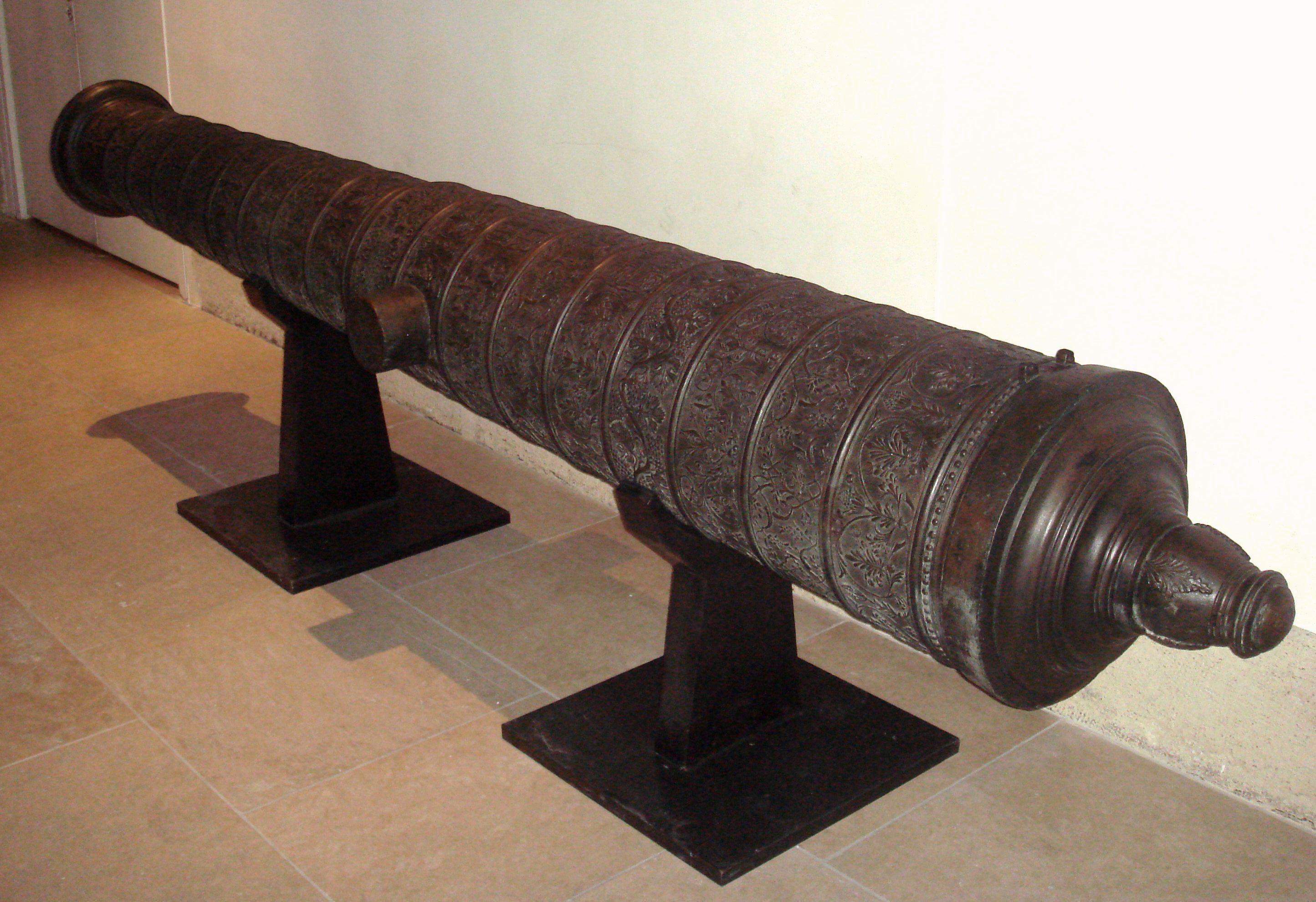
Ahmed Gurey's pioneering use of cannons supplied by the Ottomans figured prominently in his Conquest of Ethiopia.

The Ethiopian–Adal War was a military conflict between the Ethiopian Empire and the Adal Sultanate from 1529 until 1543. The Imam Ahmad ibn Ibrihim al-Ghazi (nicknamed Gurey in Somali and Gragn in Amharic (ግራኝ Graññ), both meaning "the left-handed") came close to extinguishing the ancient realm of Ethiopia, and converting all of its subjects to Islam; the intervention of the European Cristóvão da Gama, son of the famous navigator Vasco da Gama, helped to prevent this outcome. Many historians trace the origins of hostility between Somalia and Ethiopia to this war. Some historians also argue that this conflict proved, through their use on both sides, the value of firearms such as the matchlock musket, cannons, and the arquebus over traditional weapons. Imam Ahmed was the first African commander to use cannon warfare on the continent during the Adal's conquest of the Ethiopian Empire under Dawit II.

== Asia ==
=== China ===
Gunpowder was invented in China in the Tang dynasty. It started being broadly used in warfare in the Song dynasty. From the 9th through 12th century, there were widespread advances in gunpowder technology. While the Europeans were pressed on technological advancements and military developments with gunpowder, the Chinese fell back in regards to further developing military technology. This was due to the fact that the Chinese were not as heavily engaged in wars or conquests as the Europeans. Notably, when the Chinese were at war with the Portuguese, for example, they swiftly adapted to military technology, and adopted Western style guns.

The Chinese pioneered the use of gunpowder weapons, crossbows, advanced forms of arms and armor, naval and nomadic cavalry. Thus, the Chinese even adopted Western military technology. Interestingly, the Chinese had many descriptions of how they utilized their technology. For Ming China, they had experiences on the battlefield: against Chinese rebels, Shan elephants, and Mongol horsemen. Nonetheless, under the Ming dynasty, intensively practiced tactical strategies based on their firearm use. Qi Jiguang and his troops used innovative battle techniques such as counter marching, dividing the troops, as a flexible way of adapting to the battlefield. These tactics were proved effective during the Sino-Dutch War beginning in 1661. While the Chinese were undermined as the inferior empire due to lack of weaponry, their strict adherence discipline and tactical strategy led to them defeating the Dutch. This draws a parallel to the Sino-Portuguese conflict. During the first war, in 1521, the Portuguese firepower was far more effective than the Chinese. As they witnessed the power of Portuguese artillery, the Chinese better prepared for the war in 1522. They modified, adapted, innovated and improved. The Chinese were a display of rapid militarization, as they instilled Western style learnings to their knowledge of artillery and war tactical strategy.

The fire arrows (rocket arrows) were first reported to have been used by the Southern Wu in 904 during the siege of Yuzhang.

=== Safavid Empire ===
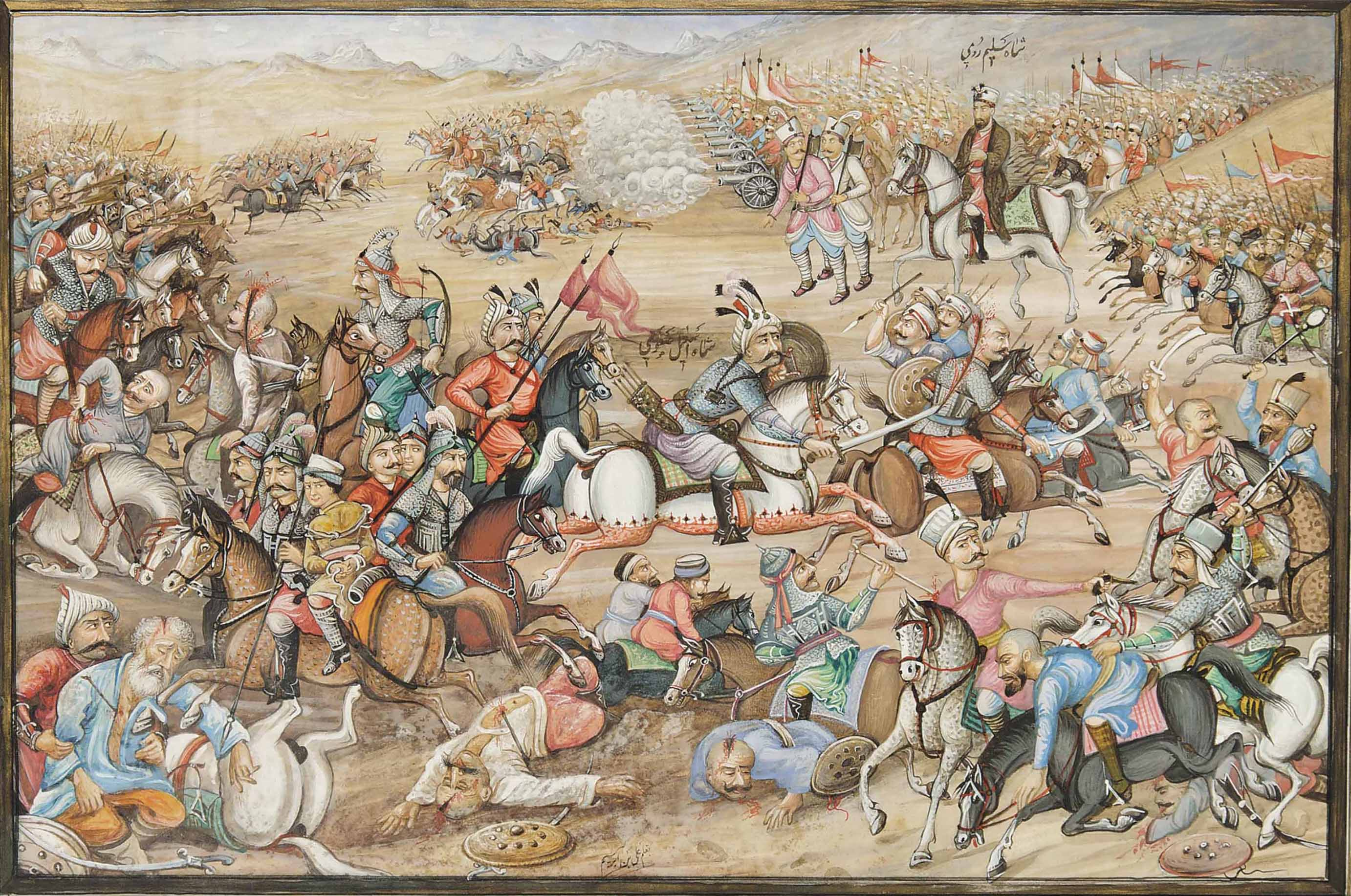
The advanced Ottoman weaponry (cannons and muskets wielded by janissaries) was the deciding factor of the Battle of Chaldiran.

Soon after the Ottoman Empire, two other Muslim gunpowder empires appeared: the Safavid Empire in Iran and the Mughal Empire in India. They both began in the early 16th century but later collapsed in the 18th century.

The refusal of their Qizilbash forces to use firearms contributed to the Safavid rout at Chaldiran in 1514.

After this, the Persians actively sought to acquire the skills to make and use firearms. In a report given to the Council of Ten on 24 September 1572, the Venetian envoy Vincenzo di Alessandri noted how firearms had become integrated into the Persian army:

They used for arms, swords, lances, arquebuses, which all the soldiers carry and use; their arms are also superior and better tempered than those of any other nation. The barrels of the arquebuses are generally six spans long, and carry a ball little less than three ounces in weight. They use them with such facility that it does not hinder them drawing their bows nor handling their swords, keeping the latter hung at their saddle bows till occasion requires them. The arquebus is then put away behind the back so that one weapon does not impede the use of the other.

=== Japan ===
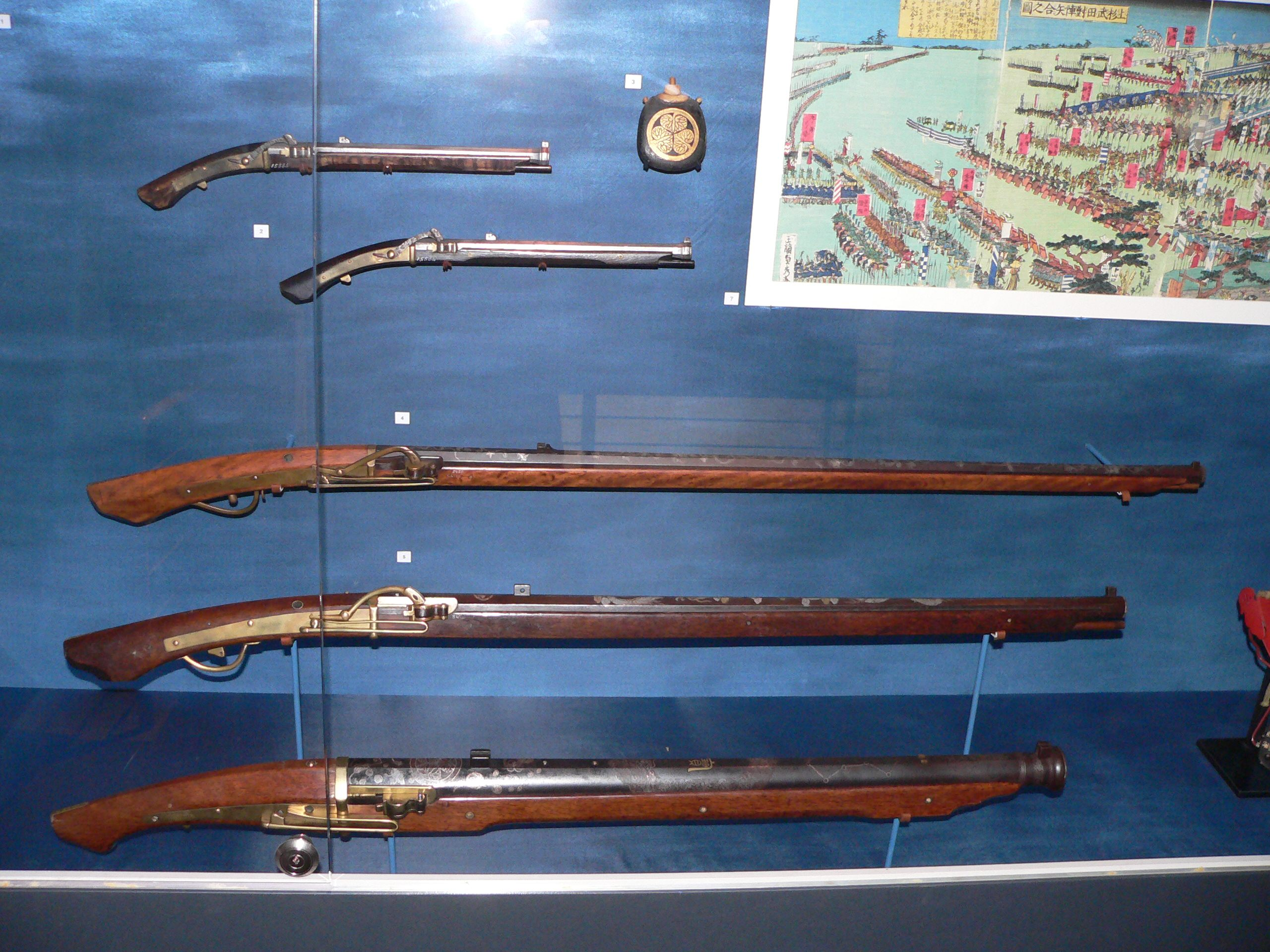
Japanese arquebus of the Edo era (teppo)

The Japanese were introduced to early firearms by Portuguese traders arriving with European style arquebuses onto the island of Tanegashima, near the island of Kyushu in September 1543. The impact of this event would revolutionize Japanese strategy throughout the Sengoku-jidai, revolving around tactics that centered on usage of firearms.

While memoirs by Fernão Mendes Pinto attribute himself and Diogo Zeimoto as the traders to initially introduce firearms to Japan, studies of said memoirs call this claim highly embellished, and therefore the validity of this claim falls into question. Daimyō of the period, searching for any sort of new tactical edge over their regional rivals, were quick to acquire and have blacksmiths under their retinue, reverse-engineer and reproduce the early European firearms. Portuguese traders visiting Japan several years later found that the Japanese had successfully reproduced hundreds of arquebuses, and by 1546, a rough estimate of over 300,000 of the early firearms were in circulation throughout Japan. Early production of said firearms were limited to the general region of Kyushu, though gunsmiths would eventually migrate throughout Japan. Different schools started to emerge from this migration. with notable examples from Sakai, Yokkaichi, and Kunitomo being the most prevalent. Moreover, production of small arms ranged from the early Tanegashima arquebus, to later production teppo, which also subdivided into arquebuses of varying caliber and length, to "hand cannons" favored by those of the Shimazu clan.

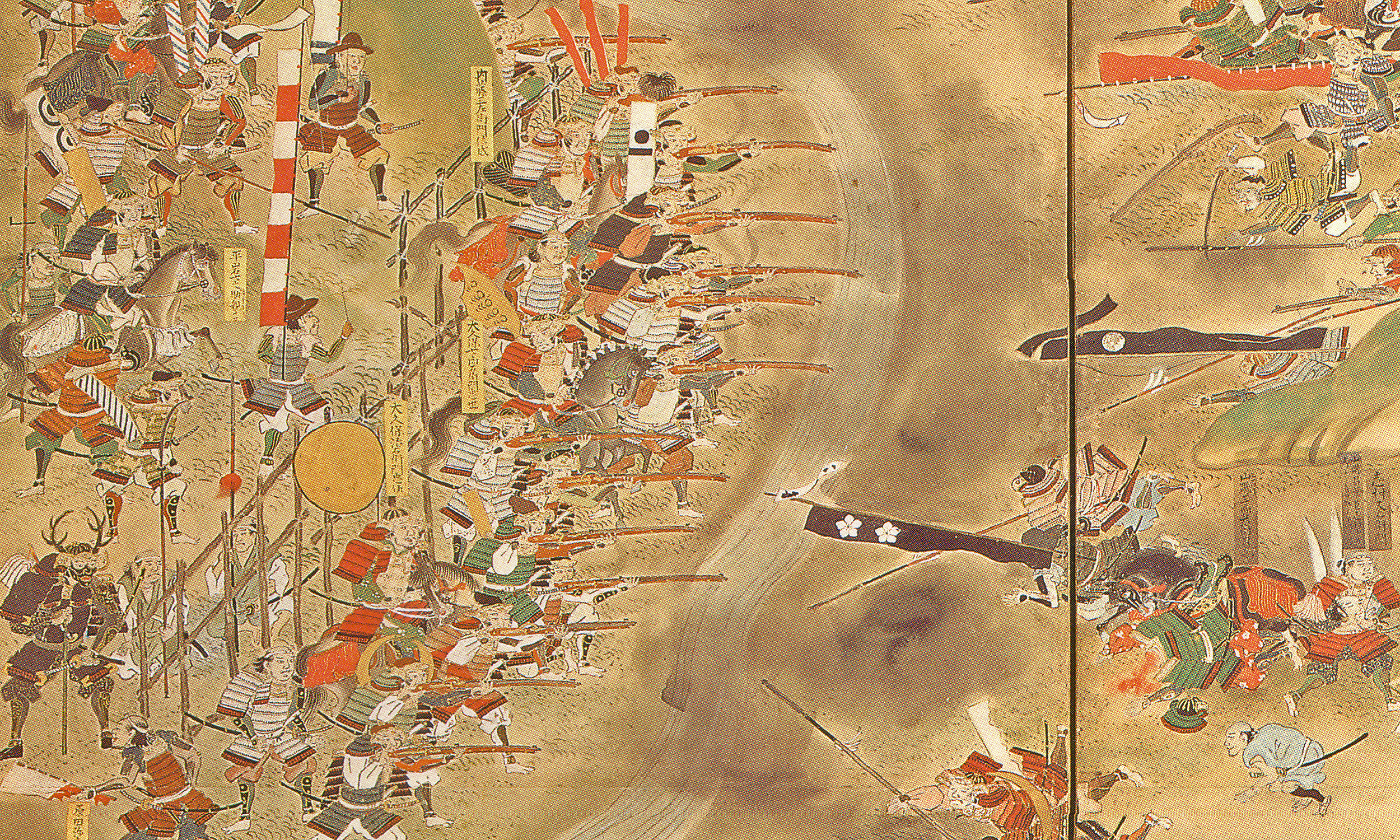
The Battle of Nagashino in 1575. Key to Oda's success during the battle was the deployment of a large number of Ashigaru arquebusiers.

Japanese military strategy upon receiving the new weapon, began to gradually shift towards infantry based tactics, rather than those that favored horseback cavalry. This is most famously portrayed at the Battle of Nagashino in 1575, where Oda Nobunaga's 3,000 riflemen had handily dispatched the much larger Takeda clan cavalry force using the first recorded utilization of volley fire. However, certain studies have disputed the claim that Nobunaga was the first to utilize this tactic, though Japanese forces were utilizing it far earlier than other world contemporaries. Japanese battle planning soon centered around manipulating one's enemies into allied fortified positions to rapidly dispatch enemy manpower, only engaging in hand-to-hand combat when necessary.

Similarly, Japanese daimyō were introduced to artillery in 1551, when a trader claiming to be the king of Rome presented elements of the Ōtomo clan with two examples of field artillery. As with their small arms counterparts, many warlords wished to quickly adopt the weapon in order to gain an advantage over their contemporaries, but difficulties in producing suitable reproductions led to limited early usage in comparison. As with personal firearms, Oda Nobunaga was early to adopt the new weapon, and later, after his death, one of his retainers Toyotomi Hideyoshi would use cannons to destructive effect to lay siege to Kanki Castle in 1582. Moreover, Nobunaga had attempted to incorporate cannons onto warships in 1578, but their inefficacy against rival naval daimyō forces under the Mori had led to the discontinuation of any further implementations to other naval forces.

These changes and adoptions into Sengoku era Japanese warfare made themselves present during the Japanese invasions of Korea of 1592–1598 after Toyotomi Hideyoshi had unified Japan. Early success in the first incursion during May 1592 into Korea was attributed to the varied small arms and tactics of the Japanese forces, allowing them to make and defend early footholds into the Korean peninsula. However, after the Koreans had allied themselves with Ming China, they gained access to better artillery with greater range and destructive power than their Japanese equivalents. Finally, the Korean navy under the command of Yi Sun-sin had utilized the superior, cannon-armed navy of the Korean-Ming alliance against the Japanese maritime supply lines, eventually leading to a shortage of supplies and Japanese losses on the mainland. Japan was driven off their last stronghold in Seoul in May 1594, and subsequent ventures 1597 would not come close to the success of the first, as the Korean-Ming alliance had developed countermeasures and equivalent small arms to Japanese equivalents.

The Japanese version of the fire arrow (rocket arrow) was known as the bo hiya. The Japanese pirates (wokou, also known as wako or kaizoku) in the 16th century were reported to have used the bo hiya which had the appearance of a large arrow. A burning element made from incendiary waterproof rope was wrapped around the shaft and when lit the bo hiya was launched from a mortar like weapon hiya taihou or a wide bore Tanegashima matchlock arquebus. During one sea battle it was said the bo hiya were "falling like rain".

=== Kingdom of Mysore ===
The first iron rockets were developed by Tipu Sultan, a Muslim ruler of the South Indian Kingdom of Mysore. He successfully used these iron rockets against the larger forces of the British East India Company during the Anglo-Mysore wars. The Mysore rockets of this period were much more advanced than what the British had seen, chiefly because of the use of iron tubes for holding the propellant; this enabled higher thrust and longer range for the missile (up to 2 km range). After Tipu's eventual defeat in the Fourth Anglo-Mysore War and the capture of the Mysore iron rockets, they were influential in British rocket development and were soon put into use in the Napoleonic Wars.

=== Durrani Empire ===
Ahmad Shah Durrani, founder of the Durrani Empire in Central Asia, was the last great Asian conqueror. In the later 18th century the Ottomans and Durranis were the sole two most powerful empires of the Muslim World. In 1761, his Third Battle of Panipat was the largest number of casualties recorded in a single day in a classic formation battle between two armies.

It was there that the Durrani-led coalition army with its fast-moving cavalry utilised camel mounted swivel-guns which the enemy cavalry could not withstand.

=== Mughal Empire ===
Babur, the founder of the Mughal Empire on the Indian subcontinent, employed firearms, gun carts and movable artillery in battle. In particular, he used them at the first Battle of Panipat (1526) to defeat the much larger forces of Ibrahim Lodhi, the last ruler of the Delhi Sultanate. Other battles he fought using gunpowder weapons include the Battle of Khanwa in 1527 against Rana Sanga, and the Battle of Ghaghra in 1529.

His descendants also employed gunpowder weapons in their expansion of the Mughal Empire, such as Akbar the Great at the second Battle of Panipat (1556) against Adil Shah Suri and Hemu of the Sur dynasty. In 1582, Fathullah Shirazi, a Persian-Indian developed a seventeen-barrelled cannon, fired with a matchlock.

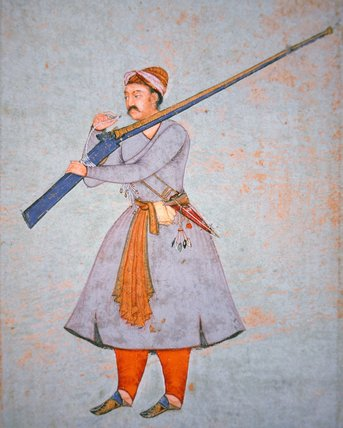
Mughal matchlock rifle

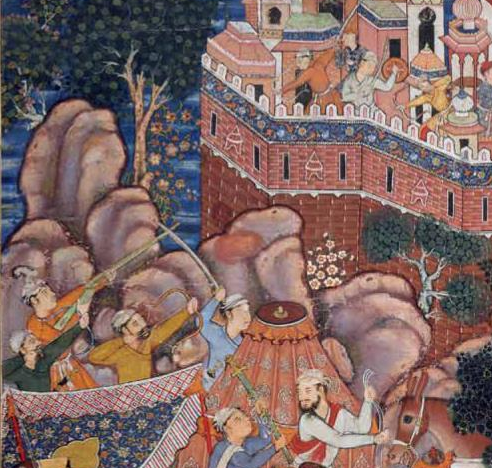
Mughal musketeer

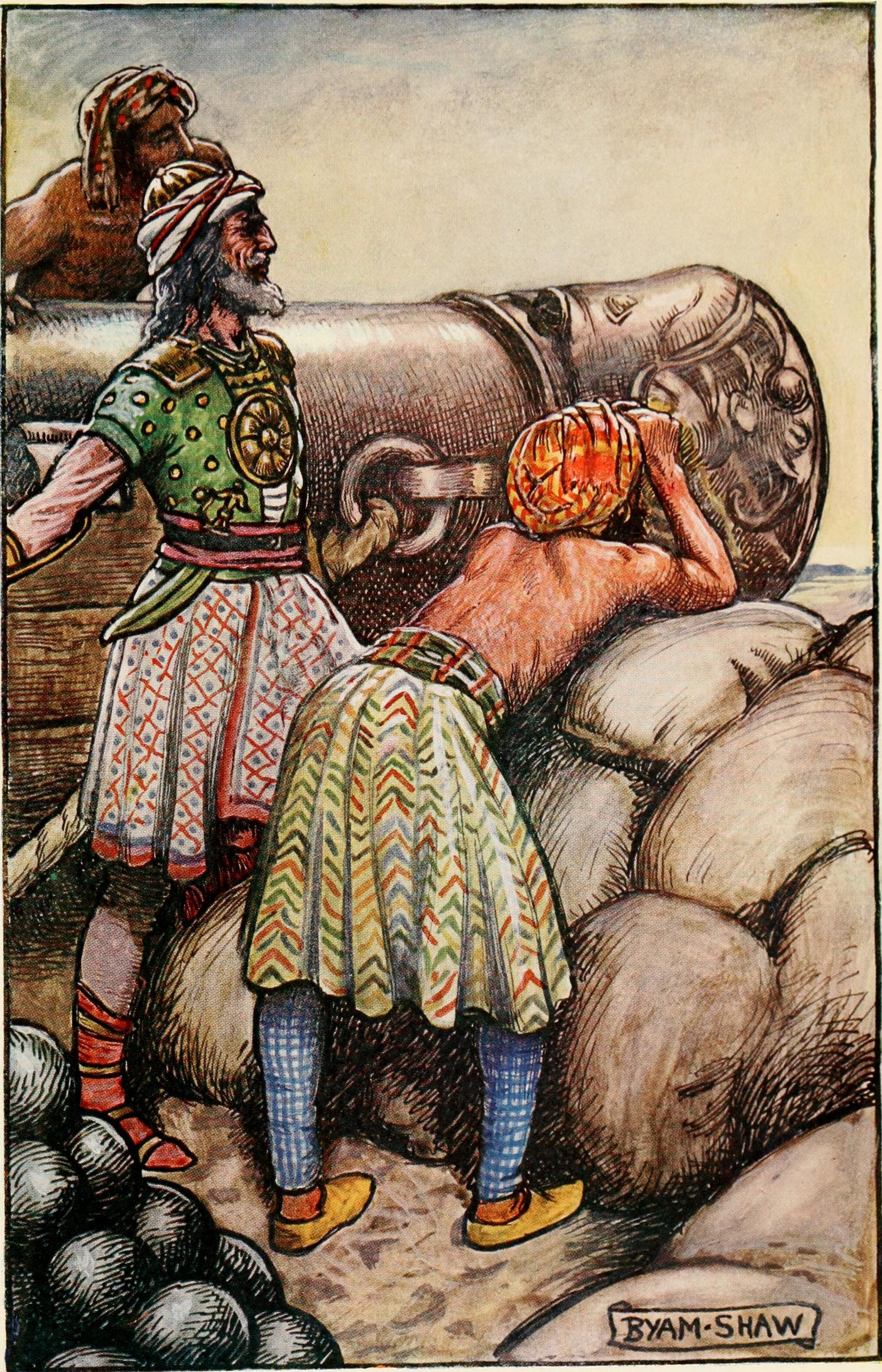
Mughal Army artillerymen during the reign of Akbar

=== Ottoman Empire ===
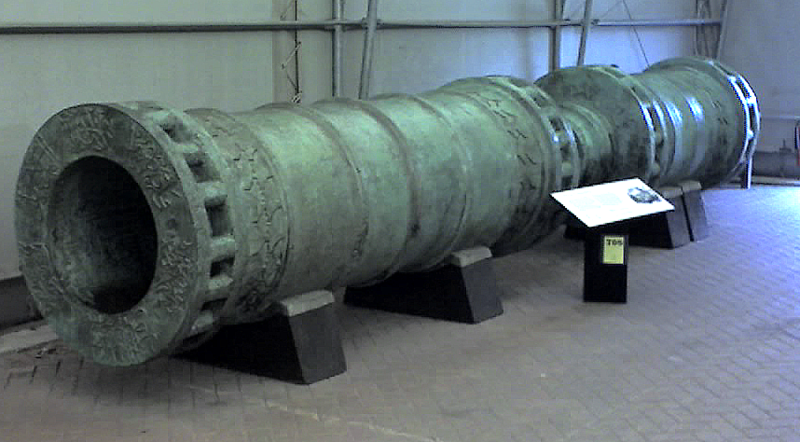
The bronze Dardanelles cannon, used by the Ottoman Turks in the siege of Constantinople in 1453

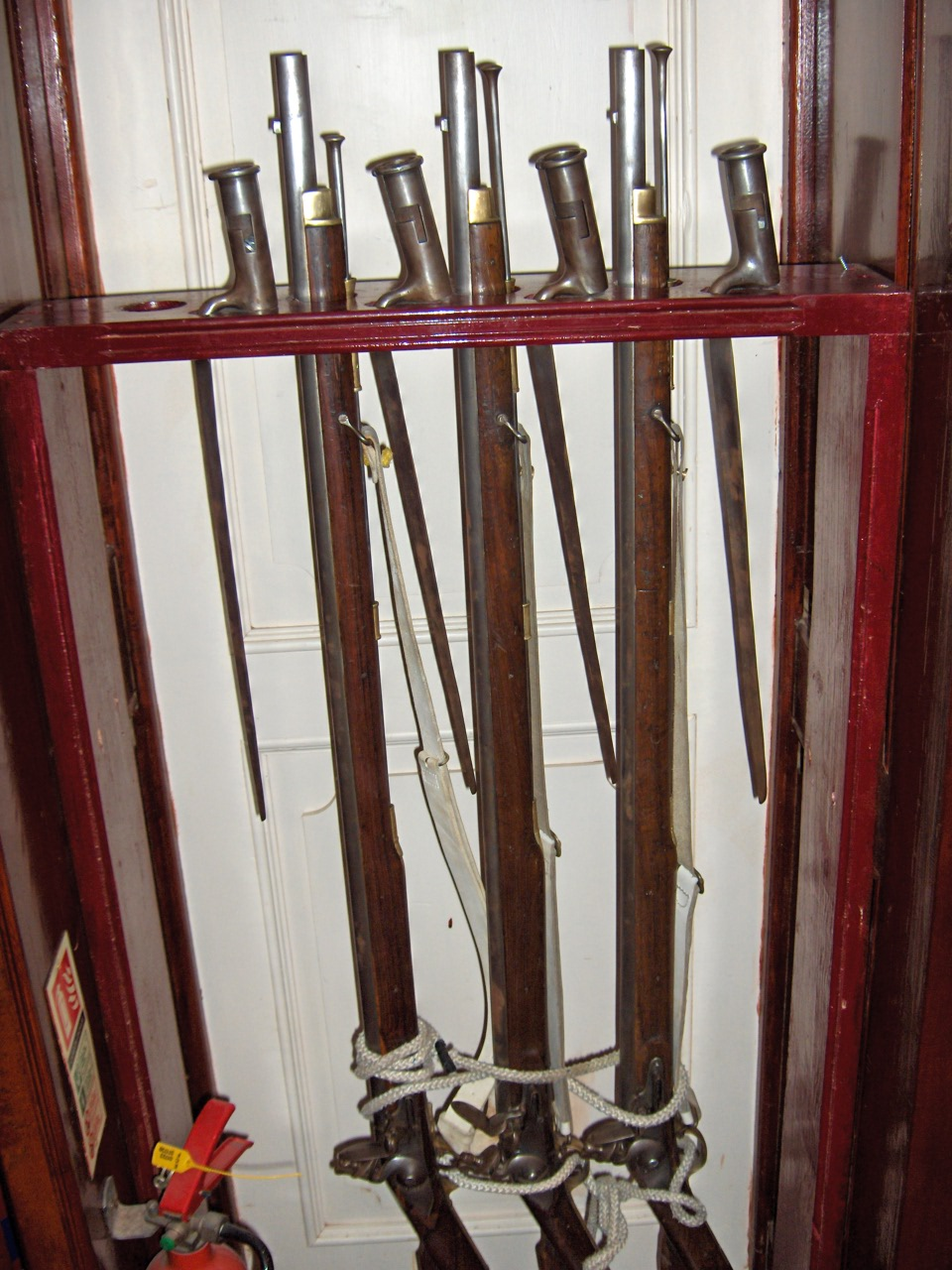
Muskets and bayonets aboard the frigate Grand Turk

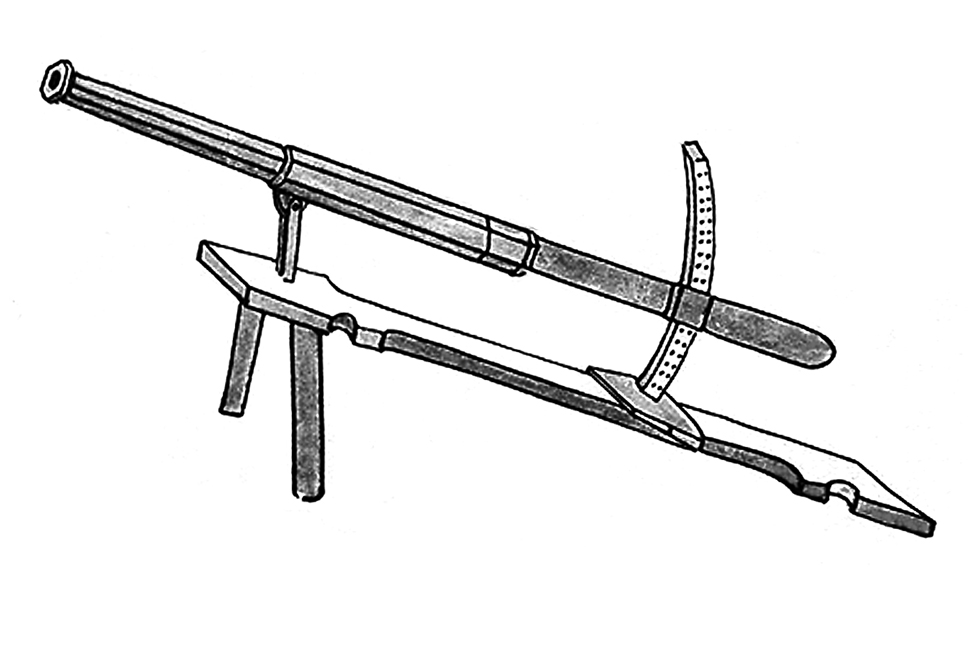
Tarasnice from the Hussite Wars (1419–1434)

The Ottoman Empire had been one of the first Middle Eastern states to effectively use gunpowder weapons and used them to great effect conquering much of the Middle East, North Africa, and the Balkans. In the 17th century the state began to stagnate as more modern technologies and strategies were not adopted. Specifically, the Ottoman Empire was slow to adopt innovations like boring cannon (rather than casting them in a mold), making the conversion from matchlock firearms to flintlocks, and the lightening of field guns and carriages.

In part this was because the military elite had become a powerful force in the empire and change threatened their positions. David Nicolle theorizes that one contributing factor to the Ottoman reluctance to adopt the flintlock musket, despite its superiority over the matchlock ignition system, was the dusty climate of much of the Middle East which could cause problems with reliability.

Overall, the Ottoman Empire between the 15th and 18th centuries has been assessed as a military producer which copies existing technologies, but does not capture the underlying process of innovation or adaption. Other research, though, complicates that view. A Chinese military manual published in 1644 compared Ottoman and European firearms in the following manner:

Firearms have been in use since the beginning of the dynasty, and field armies in battle formation have found them convenient and useful to carry along... Since muskets have been transmitted to China, these weapons have lost their effectiveness... In battle formation, aside from various cannon such as the "three generals", the breech-loading swivel gun, and the "hundred-league thunder", nothing has more range or power than the Turkish musket. The next best is the European one.

The fact that Ottoman firearms were considered by 17th century Chinese writers to be superior to European firearms demonstrates that the Ottoman Empire was at least a second tier producer of muskets during this period. However, some claim that the 'European' firearms the Chinese researcher tested were actually Japanese arquebuses based on fifty-year-old Portuguese models. The design of the Ottoman matchlock is substantially different from that of the European variety and it in turn influenced the matchlocks produced in both Safavid Persia and Mughal India.

==== 15th century ====
The Ottoman Empire by the middle of the fifteenth century had developed strategic infantry groups along with the ascension of weaponry. Early modern warfare has many important factors alongside weapons and artillery, and strategy is one of them. Developing a strong core for the sultan was key to understanding the way the Ottoman Empire could expand and take over vast territories to maintain them under their rule. One of the most important creations for their early modern warfare was a group called the Janissaries. They were considered to be an elite group of infantryman that were highly skilled and sociable. With their placement in use for the sultan, they were an unmatched military power that no European power could compete with during the fifteenth century.

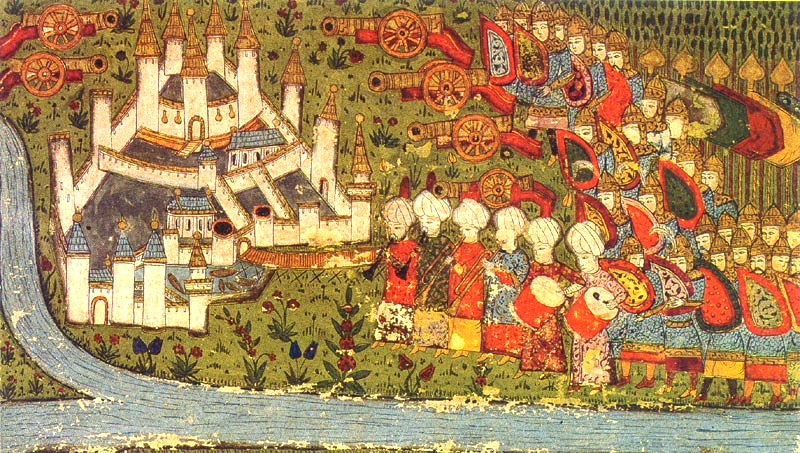
Ottoman miniature of the siege of Belgrade in 1456

The Ottoman Empire was brought up in a different way from most militaristic powers, and that was from the bottom up. They were developed in peaceful upbringings. When they conquered Constantinople in 1453, they had created a transcontinental government that would see them to continue to expand militarily and politically. They used the Janissary units to advance their stronghold on the will of the people they conquered. One of their techniques was to capture boys from the territories they had defeated and forced them to become Muslim in order to control their easily molded minds. It was a similar tactic to many growing empires, because it is understood that children are easily manipulated, and in order to maintain new territories guarded by the Janissary, they needed to have an easier population to mold. The Janissaries also had other roles outside of military conflict. They were one of the main protectors of the sultan in order to prevent coups from happening, or paramilitary units from gaining control of the empire. The problem with this is that the Ottoman Empire made the Janissaries too powerful and because of their socialization, career advancement options, and recruitment procedures, the men in the units were very cohesive and respected each other more than the sultan. This would prove to be an issue later on, but during the fifteenth century it was not an issue yet because their numbers were still growing and would continue to grow in order to boost their elite power.

A man by the name of Konstantin Mihailović was captured by the Turks in 1455 and would eventually write a memoir about his time with the Ottoman Empire's Janissary units. His account would be considered flawed because of the translations from Serbian to Czech and Polish. There is no original text from his memoir and only translations are left to work from, and those have far fetched ideas of what the Janissaries were doing during the time. He was recaptured in 1463 by Hungarian troops and eventually wrote the memoir after he became a Christian again. His memoir is an important piece of history, but scholars and historians have widely debated the authentic nature of his stories and doubt the consistency of his tales.

The Ottoman Empire was one of the first states to put gunpowder weapons into widespread use. The famous Janissary corps of the Ottoman army began using matchlock muskets as early as the 1440s. The army of Mehmed the Conqueror, which conquered Constantinople in 1453, included both artillery and foot soldiers armed with gunpowder weapons. The Ottomans brought to the siege sixty-nine guns in fifteen separate batteries and trained them at the walls of the city. The barrage of Ottoman cannon fire lasted forty days, and they are estimated to have fired 19,320 times.

==== 16th century ====
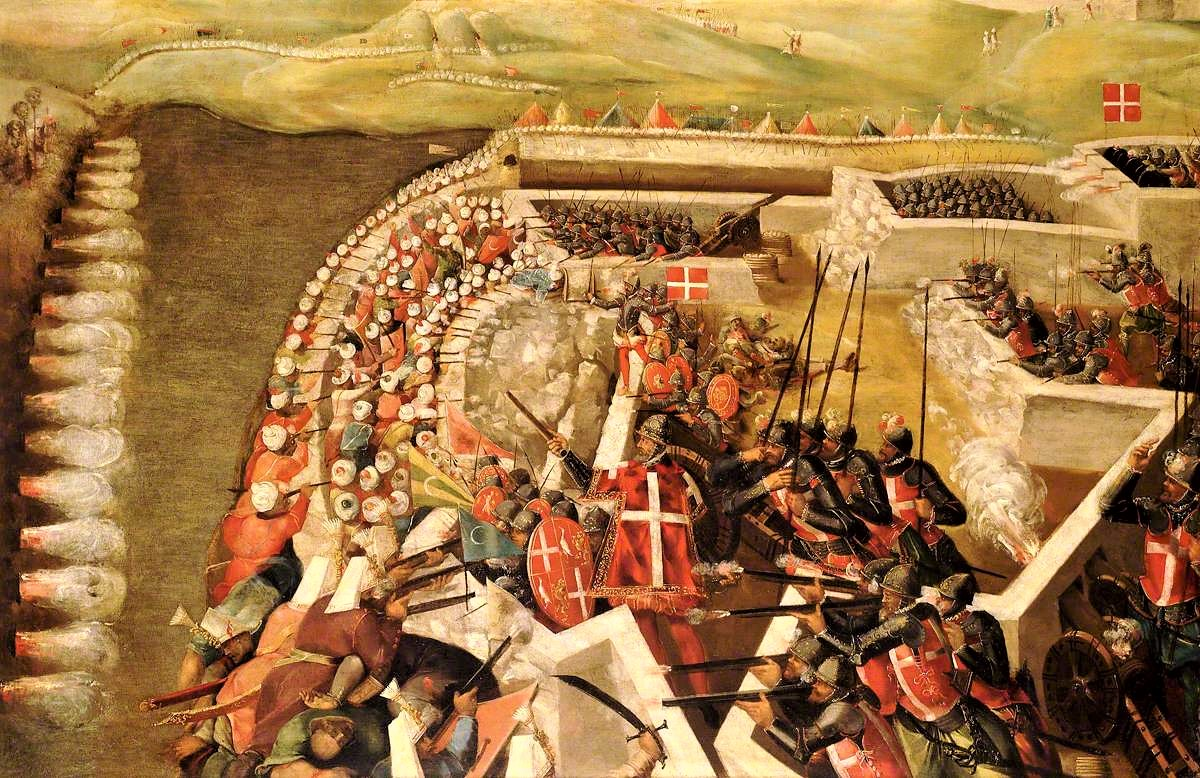
Attack on the post of the Castilian knights during the Great Siege of Malta on 21 August 1565

The 16th century saw the first widespread use of the matchlock musket as a decisive weapon on the battlefield with the Turks becoming leaders in this regard. The first of these campaigns was the campaign against the Persians in 1514 under Yavuz Sultan Selim, or Selim the Grim. Armed with gunpowder weapons, his army defeated the Persians at the Battle of Chaldiran. After his victory over the Safavids, Selim turned his attention towards the Mamluk dynasty in Egypt. The decisive battle of his campaign against the Mamluks, and the battle which highlighted the importance of the musket in the Ottoman military, was the Battle of Raydaniyah, fought in 1517. There, Selim outflanked the entrenched Mamluk artillery, and attacked the Mamluk forces with his Janissaries. The Janissaries, armed with firearms, destroyed the Mamluk army, armed mostly with traditional swords and javelins.

Reference was made by João de Barros to a sea battle outside Jiddah, in 1517, between Portuguese and Ottoman vessels. The Muslim force under Salman Reis had "three or four basilisks firing balls of thirty palms in circumference". This was estimated to be a cannon of about 90 inch bore "firing cut stone balls of approximately 1,000 pounds (453 kg)".

After the death of Selim, he was succeeded by his son Suleiman the Magnificent. During his reign, gunpowder weapons continued to be used effectively. One important example is the Battle of Mohács in 1526. During this battle, Ottoman artillery, and Janissaries armed with muskets, were able to cut down charging Hungarian cavalry.

==== 17th century ====
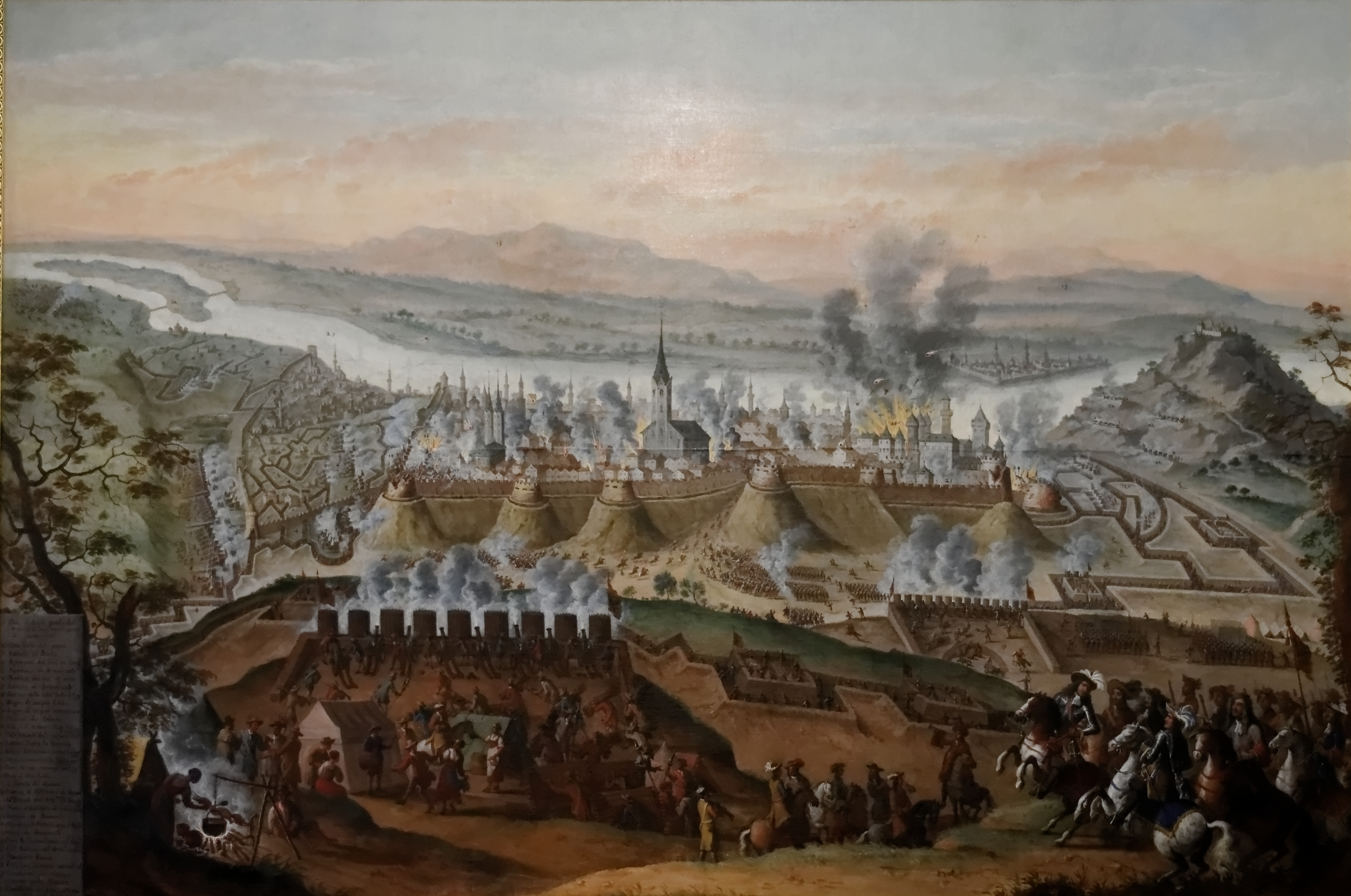
The Siege of Buda in 1686

Although the cannon and musket were employed by the Ottomans long beforehand, by the 17th century they witnessed how ineffective the traditional cavalry charges were in the face of concentrated musket-fire volleys. In a report given by an Ottoman general in 1602, he confessed that the army was in a distressed position due to the emphasis in European forces for musket-wielding infantry, while the Ottomans relied heavily on cavalry. Thereafter it was suggested that the Janissaries, who were already trained and equipped with muskets, become more heavily involved in the imperial army while led by their agha.

By the middle of the 17th century, the continued reliance of the Ottomans on over-heavy ordnance had been made out by European officers as a liability. Raimondo Montecuccoli, the Habsburg commander who defeated the Ottomans at Battle of Saint Gotthard commented on Ottoman cannon:

This enormous artillery produces great damage when it hits, but it is awkward to move and it requires too much time to reload and site. Furthermore, it consumes a great amount of powder, besides cracking and breaking the wheels and the carriages and even the ramparts on which it is placed ... our artillery is more handy and more efficient and here resides our advantage over the cannon of the Turks.

=== Vietnam ===
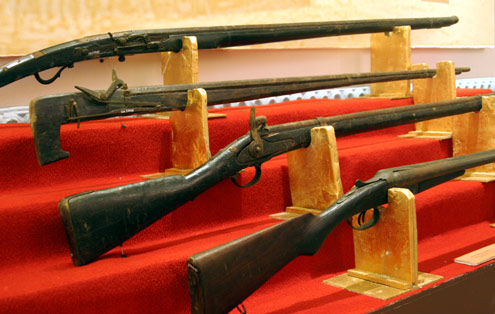
Goa-style arquebuses were probably widespread in Vietnam during the 17th century

Western matchlock arquebuses were imported into Vietnam during the early 16th century. The raging and lengthy wars between Le and Mac dynasties, and later Trinh and Nguyen clans invoked an arm race between the opposing factions. Gunnery and marksmanship rapidly spread across the country and soon Vietnamese musketeers became famous within Asia as masters of firearms.

== See also ==
- Cabinet wars
- Gunpowder magazine
- Kabinettskriege
- Battle of Caishi
- Battle of Tangdao
- Technology of the Song dynasty
- Pike and shot

== Bibliography ==
- Chase, Kenneth (2003), Firearms: A global history to 1700, Cambridge University Press.
- Crosby, Alfred W. (2002), Throwing fire: Projectile technology through history, Cambridge University Press.
- Gartz, Jochen, "Vom Griechischen feuer zum dynamit. Eine kulturgeschichte der explosivstoffe.", E. S. Mittler & Sohn, Hamburg (Germany) 2007, ISBN 978-3-8132-0867-2.
- Guilmartin, John Francis (1974), Gunpowder and Galleys: Changing technology and Mediterranean warfare at sea in the sixteenth century, Cambridge University Press
- Hodgson, Marshall G. S. (1974). The Venture of Islam: Conscience and History in a World Civilization'. Chicago: University of Chicago Press. ISBN 978-0226346779.
- Keegan, John, "The face of battle: a study of Agincourt, Waterloo, and the Somme", London: Barrie & Jenkins, 1988.
- Kelly, Jack (2004), Gunpowder: Alchemy, Bombards & Pyrotechnics. The history of the explosive that changed the world., Basic Books.
- Khan, Iqtidar Alam (2004), Gunpowder and firearms: Warfare in medieval India, Oxford University Press.
- Needham, Joseph (1986), "Science and civilization in China: Volume 4, Part 3", Taipei: Caves Books, Ltd.
- Needham, Joseph (1986), Science & civilisation in China, vol. V:7: "The gunpowder epic", Cambridge University Press.
- Parker Geoffrey, "The military revolution and the rise of the West".
- Parker Geoffrey, "Empire war and faith in early modern Europe", Penguin Books, London 2003.
- Peter Paret, Gordon A. Craig, Felix Gilbert, ed. "Makers of modern strategy: from Machiavelli to the nuclear age", Princeton, N.J.: Princeton University Press, 1986.
- Schürger, André (2015), "The battle of Lützen: an examination of 17th century military material culture", University of Glasgow
- Sturdy, David, "Fractured Europe, 1600–1721", Blackwell, Oxford 2002.
- Tallet, Frank, "War and society in early modern Europe 1495–1715", Routledge, London 1992.
- Townsend, Charles. "The Oxford history of modern war", Oxford University Press, 2000.
- Zhang, Yunming (1986), "Ancient Chinese sulfur manufacturing processes", Isis, 77 (3): 487–497, doi:10.1086/354207, PMID 3533841, S2CID 144187385
