= Hobicha =

Hobicha: Hobicha Allaana (Wolaytta); ሆብቻ ወረዳ (Amharic)
- Woreda
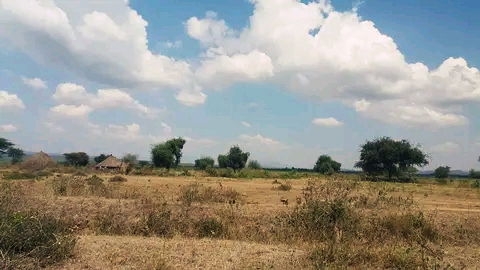
- Interactive map of Hobicha
- Country: Ethiopia
- Region: South Ethiopia Regional State
- Zone: Wolaita
- Seat: Hobicha Bada

Hobicha is district in Wolaita Zone of South Ethiopia Regional State. The woreda was established in 2019 from the surrounding woredas. And those surrounding woredas formed border to the Hobicha woreda. Hobicha is bordered on the south by Bilate River and Lake Abaya, on the west by the Abala Abaya woreda, on the north by the Damot Weyde woreda, on the east by Diguna Fango woreda and Bilate River. The administrative center of this woreda is Bada Town.
