= Bada (rural locality) =

Rural locality in Khiloksky District, Zabaykalsky Krai, Russia

Coordinates: 51°24′N 109°54′E

Bada (Russian: Бада) is a rural locality (a selo) in Khiloksky District of Zabaykalsky Krai, Russia, located along the Khilok River. Population: 4,687 (2010 census); 5,382 (2002 census).

== History ==
The first train at the future Bada station

Bada was founded in 1895 as a railway station of the Trans-Siberian Railway. During the Russian Civil War in Transbaikal in 1920, the Japanese Expeditionary Troops and military formations of the Far Eastern Republic met at the Bada and Gongota stations to ensure a secure evacuation of the Japanese forces home. Prompted by the Japanese withdrawal from Eastern Siberia during summer of 1920, the Soviet troops launched a series of operations which ended in liberation of Chita and Transbaikal from the troops of ataman Grigory Semyonov in October 1920.

In the following decades Bada developed quickly and its population increased significantly in the 1960s because of the nearby construction of Bada air base.

Since the 1990s, there has been a permanent population decrease in Bada and nearby villages. The railroad is currently the only provider of employment.
