= Bada (air base) =

Airport in Zabaykalsky Krai, Russia

Bada
- Bada, Zabaykalsky Krai in Russia
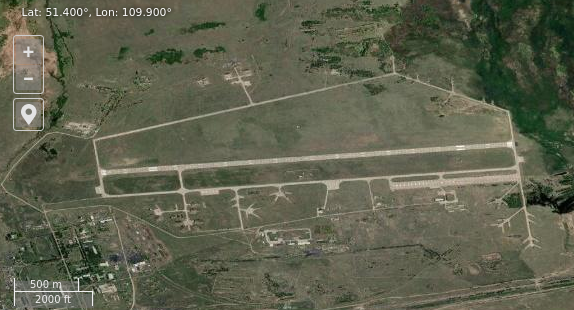
- Satellite imagery of Bada air base

Site information
- Type: Air Base
- Owner: Ministry of Defence
- Operator: Russian Air Force

Location
- Shown within Zabaykalsky Krai Bada (Russia)
- Coordinates: 51°24′N 109°54′E

Site history
- In use: -present

Airfield information
- Identifiers: ICAO: XIAB
- Elevation: 762 metres (2,500 ft) AMSL
Runways
Direction	Length and surface
09/27	2,500 metres (8,202 ft) Concrete

Bada (also given as Bata) is an airbase in Russia located 3 km north-east of Bada in Zabaykalsky Krai. There are several clusters of remote revetments for fighter aircraft, and large tarmac. Forward aviation base.

== Station history ==
Units known to have served here include the 21 BAP (21st Bomber Aviation Regiment) flying Su-24 aircraft and 313 BAP (313th Bomber Aviation Regiment) flying Su-24MR aircraft. As of 2010 there were approximately 21 of the 30 assigned Su-24s operational.

The base also houses a long range radar installation 51°24′11″N 109°54′24″E equipped with the P-14 "Tall King" 2D VHF radar (possibly the 5Н84A "Oborona-14" Tall King C) mobile version for early warning.

== See also ==
- List of military airbases in Russia
