= Abala Abaya =

Abala Abaya: Abbala Abbaayaa Allaana (Wolaytta); አባላ አባያ ወረዳ (Amharic)
- District
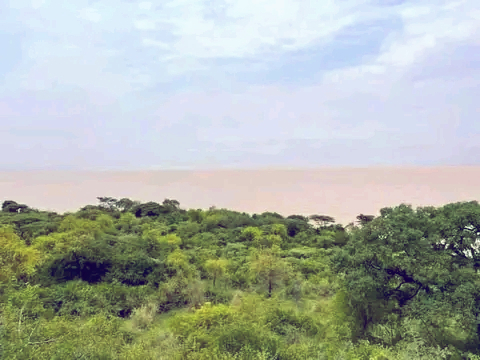
- Abaya lake shores in Abala Abaya
- Interactive map of Abala Abaya
- Country: Ethiopia
- Region: South Ethiopia Regional State
- Zone: Wolaita
- Seat: Paracho

Government
  - Chief administrator: Mesfin Bergene (Prosperity Party)

Population
  - Total: 56,812

Abala Abaya is a district in Wolayita Zone of South Ethiopia Regional State. The district is composed of 16 kebele administrations, of which 13 are rural and 3 are urban. It is situated between 6°38′ N latitude and 37 ° 42′ E longitude and located at a distance of 419 km south from Addis Ababa. The district was established in 2019 from the surrounding districts. Abala Abaya is bordered on the south by Lake Abaya, on the west by the Humbo district, on the north by the Sodo Zuria district, on the east by Hobicha district. The administrative center of this district is Paracho Town.

== Population ==
The total population of the district is about 56,812. Total households of the district are 27,627 of which 16,981 male and 10,646 female households.
