= Anglo-Mughal War =

Anglo-Mughal War (1686–1690) was a war fought between Mughal Empire and British East India Company in the late 17th century.

Anglo-Mughal War may also refer to:

- Bengal War (1757–1765)
- Carnatic Wars (1744–1763)
- Indian rebellion (1857)

== See also ==
- Battle of Delhi (1803), Mughals lose all possessions beyond Saharanpur (Old Delhi)
