= Caishi Rock =

Rock in Anhui, China

- Simplified Chinese: 采石矶
- Traditional Chinese: 采石磯
Transcriptions
Standard Mandarin
- Hanyu Pinyin: Cǎishí jī

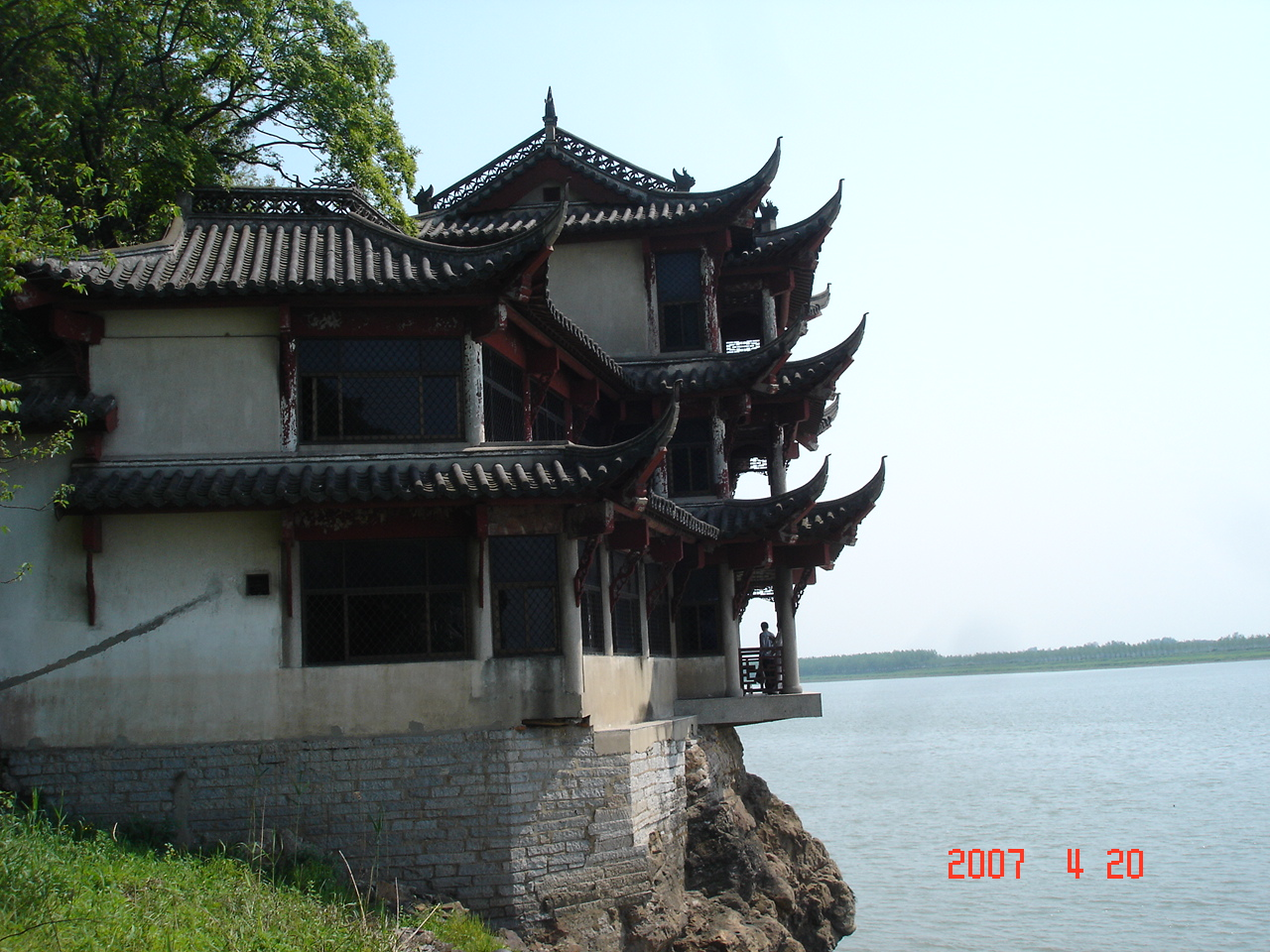

Caishi Rock (simplified Chinese: 采石矶; traditional Chinese: 采石磯; pinyin: Cǎishí jī), also named Niuzhu Rock (simplified Chinese: 牛渚矶; traditional Chinese: 牛渚磯; pinyin: Niúzhǔ jī), is a large rock located in the Yangtze River, located in Ma'anshan, Anhui, China. It is the first of the three most famous rocks in the Yangtze, together with Chengling Rock (城陵矶) and Swallow Rock (燕子矶). It has been an AAAAA Grade Tourist Attraction of China since 2020.

== Geography ==
Caishi Rock is located on the southern shore of the Yangtze, directly west of Ma'anshan. It is surrounded on the west by the Yangtze, on the north and east by the Suoxi River (锁溪河), and further south by the Caishi River (采石河). It occupies an area of around 80 hectares. It has been an important crossing over the Yangtze during Imperial China, as its flow becomes less steep after moving towards a northeastern direction.

Caishi Rock is the origin of the famous Caishi Rock Chagan (采石矶茶干), made out of soybeans into a type of dougan, wrapped in different seasonings including tea leaves. This chagan requires fifty-six procedures to be made.

== History ==
Owing to its strategic location over the Yangtze, between Wuhu and Nanjing, it has been a major crossing over the Yangtze. This has led to many military engagements and famous poets to visit Caishi.

=== Battles ===
Over its history, Caishi Rock was famous for its many military engagements throughout Chinese history since the Eastern Han dynasty. Historically, invading armies from the North have primarily selected Caishi as their primary crossing over the Yangtze, by building a navy at Chaohu Lake and attacking the Southern governments' capital Nanjing. Some battles are listed below:

- 195, Three Kingdoms, part of Sun Ce's conquests in Jiangdong: Sun Ce crosses the Yangtze and defeats Liu Yao's army led by Ze Rong here, but is himself wounded during the battle.
- July 880, Huang Chao Rebellion: Huang Chao shatters Imperial resistance and forcefully crosses the Yangtze here. He proceeds to cross the Huai River and captures Luoyang in November.
- October 974, part of Song conquest of Southern Tang: Song troops decisively defeat the Southern Tang army, exposing the Southern Tang Capital Nanjing directly.
- November 1161, part of the Jin-Song Wars: The Song army led by Chen Kangbo and Yu Yunwen decisively defeats the invading Jin army led by Wanyan Liang, who is assassinated after the battle in a mutiny.
- February 1356: Zhu Yuanzhang, founding emperor of the Ming dynasty, decisively defeats the Yuan army here, and takes Nanjing the next month.

=== Li Bai at Caishi ===
The famous Tang poet Li Bai visited Caishi many times, and spent the later years of his life near Caishi and Dangtu. During his time at Caishi, he wrote more than fifty poems, including Hengjiangci (横江词), Niuzhu Rock (牛渚矶), and Looking towards the Tianmen Mountains (望天门山).

By legend, Li Bai is said to have died by drowning after falling from his boat while drunk, as he tried to embrace the reflection of the moon in the Yangtze River. The Tomb of Li Bai is located here.

== Sights ==
A Buddhist temple, Guangji Temple, is located here. It was built during the Eastern Wu period, in 239 AD. Only the well (Chiniao Well赤乌井) is original – the temple has been rebuilt many times due to damage from wars.

Sanyuan Cave (三元洞),

Santai Pavilion (三台阁) is a five-story, 30-meter-tall (98 ft) pavilion located at the highest point of Caishi Rock. It was built during the fifteenth year of the Chongzhen era in the Ming dynasty (1642 AD). It was destroyed by war during the Qianlong era, and later rebuilt.

Taibai Tower (太白楼) and Taibai Hall (太白祠) is the biggest Li Bai memorial hall in China. It is a three-story 18-meter-tall (59 ft) building. A statue of Li Bai is located within the complex. The complex was destroyed many times by fire since its building in the Tang dynasty (although this is contested ), while the current complex was the result of rebuilding during the third year of the Guangxu era by Peng Yulin.

It is grouped with the famous Yueyang Tower, Yellow Crane Tower, and Pavilion of Prince Teng as the Four Towers of the Yangtze (长江三楼一阁). It is a 7th batch Historical National priority protected site.

== See also ==
- Chenglingji
- Swallow Rock
- Yangtze
- Dangtu County
- Ma'anshan
