= Rocket launcher =

Portable device that propels unguided rockets

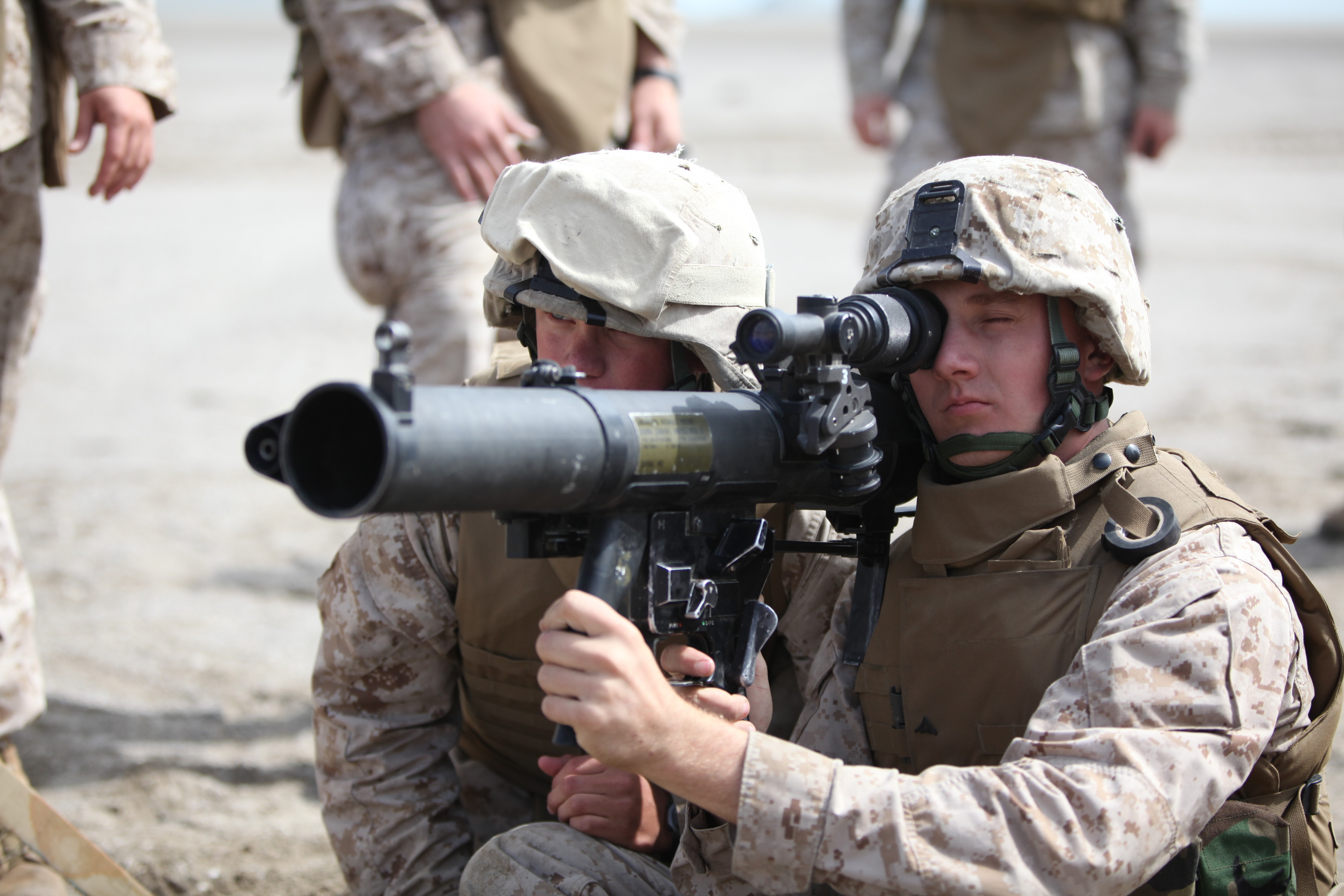
A US Marine wielding an Mk 153 SMAW, a modern rocket launcher.

A rocket launcher is a device, most often a weapon, that launches an unguided, rocket-propelled projectile. The projectile contains at least one component of what is called a warhead, which is usually explosive.

The purpose of the projectile launched, the "rocket", depends on the situation. For example, there are rockets with warheads designed specifically to explode and pierce through heavy vehicle armor such as those of tanks (HEAT warheads), and are hence anti-tank explosive weapons. Rockets may contain a guidance system and an ability to steer towards targets, these guided rockets are called "missiles"; however this article will be focusing on the launchers of unguided rockets. The launcher itself is usually a tube or multiple tubes containing the rockets and can be carried by a crew or be attached to a vehicle.

Early examples appeared in imperial China as arrow-mounted rocket motors and organized multi-tube launchers, and the technology later spread worldwide, producing forms such as the Congreve rockets used in the early 19th century and experimental systems used in the American Civil War. In the 20th century, rocket launchers became a major class of military weapons. During and after World War II, vehicle-mounted multiple rocket launchers were developed, along with a variety of shipborne, ground and air launch systems, while the postwar era saw the introduction of widely used shoulder-fired anti-tank systems, and aircraft rocket pods for close air support.

== History ==
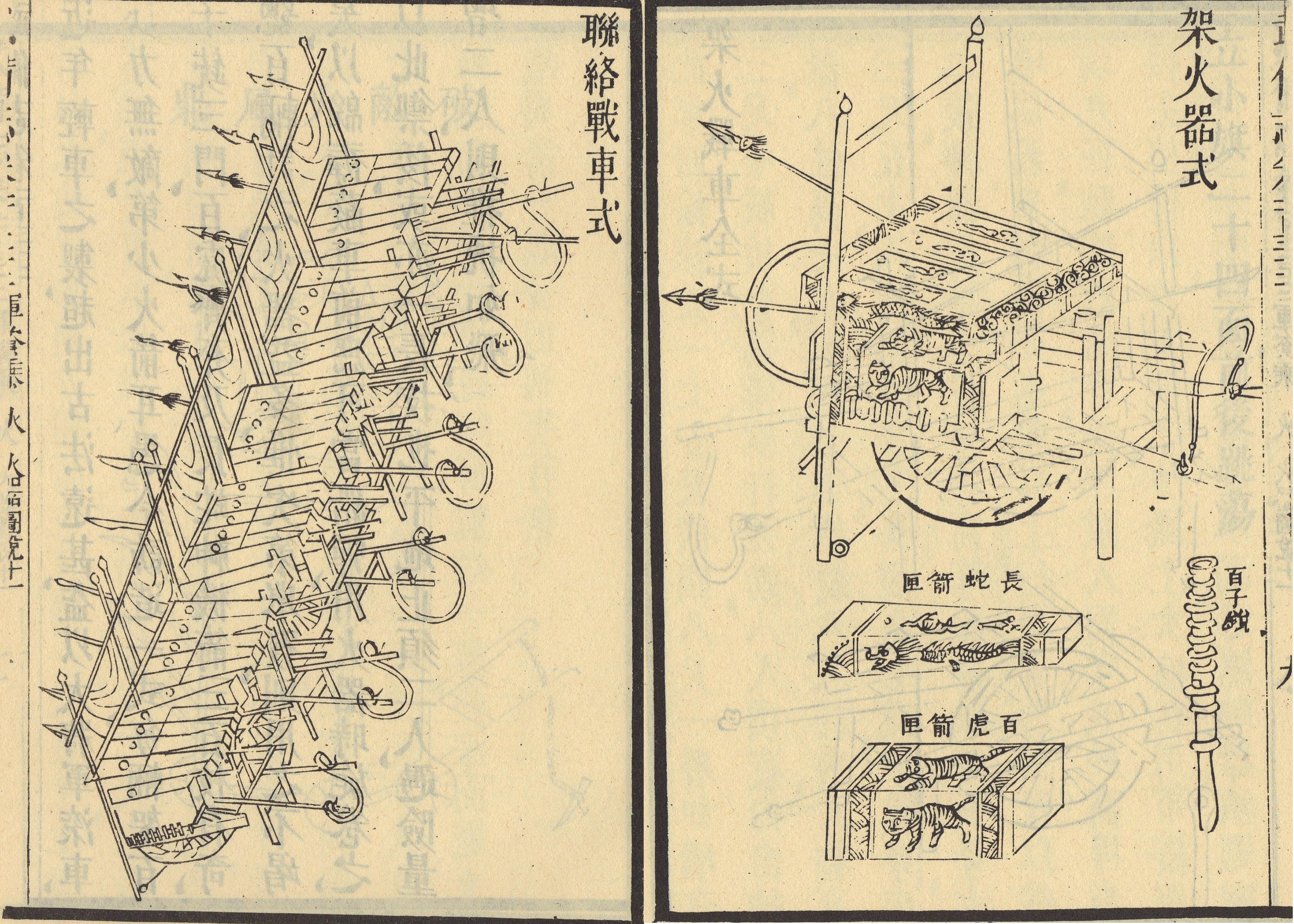
Rocket carts from the Wubei Zhi

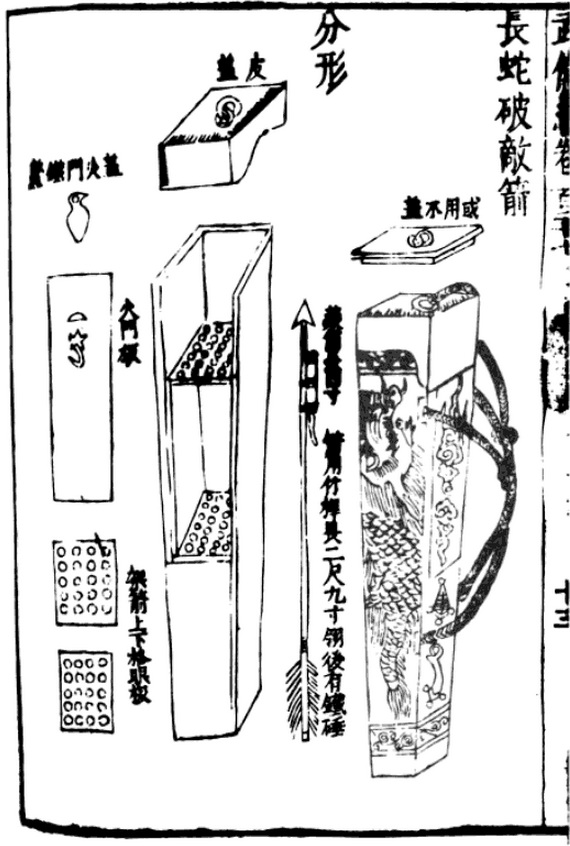
A depiction of a 'long serpent' rocket launcher from the Wubei Zhi

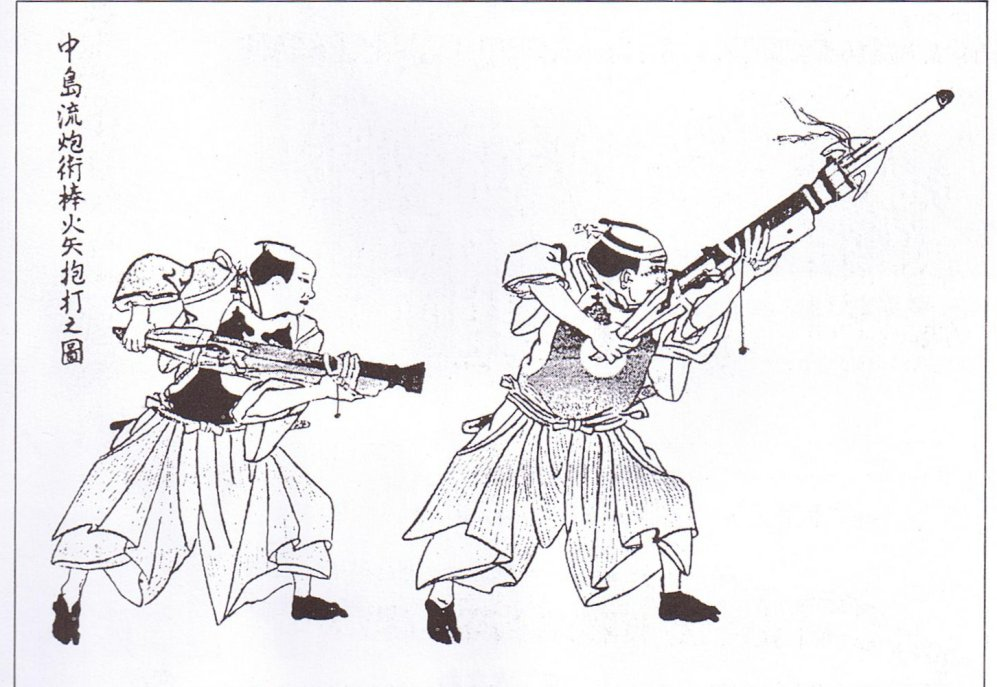
An Edo period wood block print showing samurai gunners firing bo-hiya with hiya-zutsu (fire arrow guns).

The earliest rocket launchers documented in imperial China consisted of arrows modified by the attachment of a rocket motor to the shaft a few inches behind the arrowhead. The rocket was propelled by the burning of the black powder in the motor; these should not be confused with early fire arrows, which were conventional arrows carrying small tubes of black powder as an incendiary that ignited only after the arrow hit its target. The rocket launchers were constructed of wood, basketry, and bamboo tubes. The launchers divided the rockets with frames meant to keep them separated, and the launchers were capable of firing multiple rockets at once. Textual evidence and illustrations of various early rocket launchers are found in the 1510 edition of the Wujing Zongyao translated by Needham and others at Princeton University. (The original Wujing Zongyao was compiled between 1040 and 1044 and described the discovery of black powder but preceded the invention of the rocket. Partial copies of the original survived and Wujing Zongyao was republished in 1231 during the Southern Song dynasty, including military developments since the original 1044 publication. The British scientist, sinologist, historian Joseph Needham asserts that the 1510 edition is the most reliable in its faithfulness to the original and 1231 versions, since it was printed from blocks that were re-carved directly from tracings of the edition made in 1231 AD.) The 1510 Wujing Zongyao describes the "long serpent" rocket launcher, a rocket launcher constructed of wood and carried with a wheelbarrow, and the "hundred tiger" rocket launcher, a rocket launcher made of wood and capable of firing 320 rocket arrows. The text also describes a portable rocket carrier consisting of a sling and a bamboo tube.

Rocket launchers known as "wasp nest" launchers were used by the Ming dynasty in 1380 and in 1400 by Li Jinglong against Zhu Di.

rockets first appeared in European warfare in 1380 Battle of Chioggia. According to the 18th-century historian Ludovico Antonio Muratori, rockets were used in the war between the Republics of Genoa and Venice at Chioggia in 1380. It is uncertain whether Muratori was correct in his interpretation, as the reference might also have been to bombard, but Muratori is the source for the widespread claim that the earliest recorded European use of rocket artillery dates to 1380.

Iron-cased rockets were used by Kingdom of Mysore under the rule of King Hyder Ali. King Hyder Ali and his son King Tipu Sultan, used the rockets effectively against the British East India Company during the 1780s and 1790s. Their conflicts with the company exposed the British to this technology further, which was then used to advance European rocketry with the development of the Congreve rocket in 1805 (Tipu Sultan rockets) during the mid 18th century, and were later modified and used by the British. The later models and improvements were known as the Congreve rocket and used in the Napoleonic Wars.

The Congreve rocket was a British weapon devised by Sir William Congreve in 1804 after experiencing Indian rockets at the Siege of Seringapatam (1799). Congreve rockets were launched from an iron trough about 18 inches (46 centimetres) in length, called a chamber. These chambers could be fixed to the ground for horizontal launching, secured to a folding copper tripod for high angle fire or mounted on frames on carts or the decks of warships.

The collection of the royal armies includes man-portable rocket launchers that appear (based on lock designs) to date from the two decades after 1820. These don't appear to have entered general use and no surviving documentation on them has been found.

During the American Civil War, both the US and the Confederate militaries experimented upon and produced rocket launchers. Confederate forces used Congreve rockets in limited uses due to its inaccuracies, while the US forces used Hale patent rocket launcher which fired seven to ten inch rockets with fin stabilizers at a range of 2,000 yards (6,000 ft).

=== World War II ===
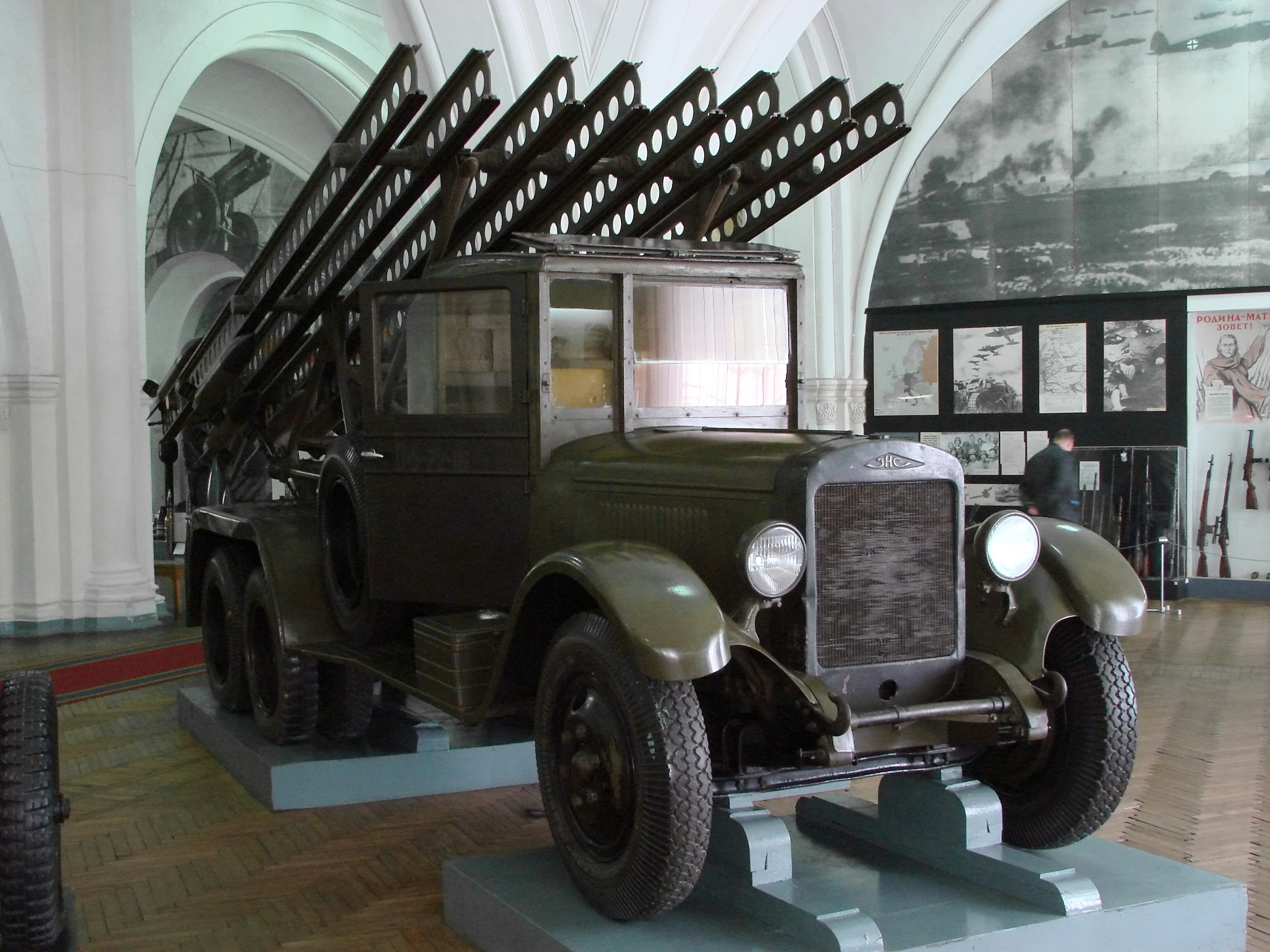
A World War II Katyusha rocket launcher, mounted on a ZiS-6 truck.

Pre-war research programmes into military rocket technology by many of the major powers led to the introduction of a number of rocket artillery systems with fixed or mobile launchers, often capable of firing a number of rockets in a single salvo. In the United Kingdom, solid fuel rockets were initially used in the anti-aircraft role; the 7-inch Unrotated Projectile was fired from single pedestal-mounted launchers on warships and a 3-inch version was used by shore based Z Batteries, for which multiple "projectors" were developed. Later developments of these weapons included the Land Mattress multiple launchers for surface-to-surface bombardment and the RP-3 air-to-ground rockets that were launched from rails fitted to fighter bomber aircraft. In Germany, the 15 cm Nebelwerfer 41 was an adaptation of a multiple barrelled smoke mortar for artillery rockets. The Soviet's Katyusha was a self-propelled system, being mounted on trucks, tanks and even trains. The United States Army deployed the tank mounted T34 Calliope system late in the war.

== Types ==
=== Shoulder-fired ===
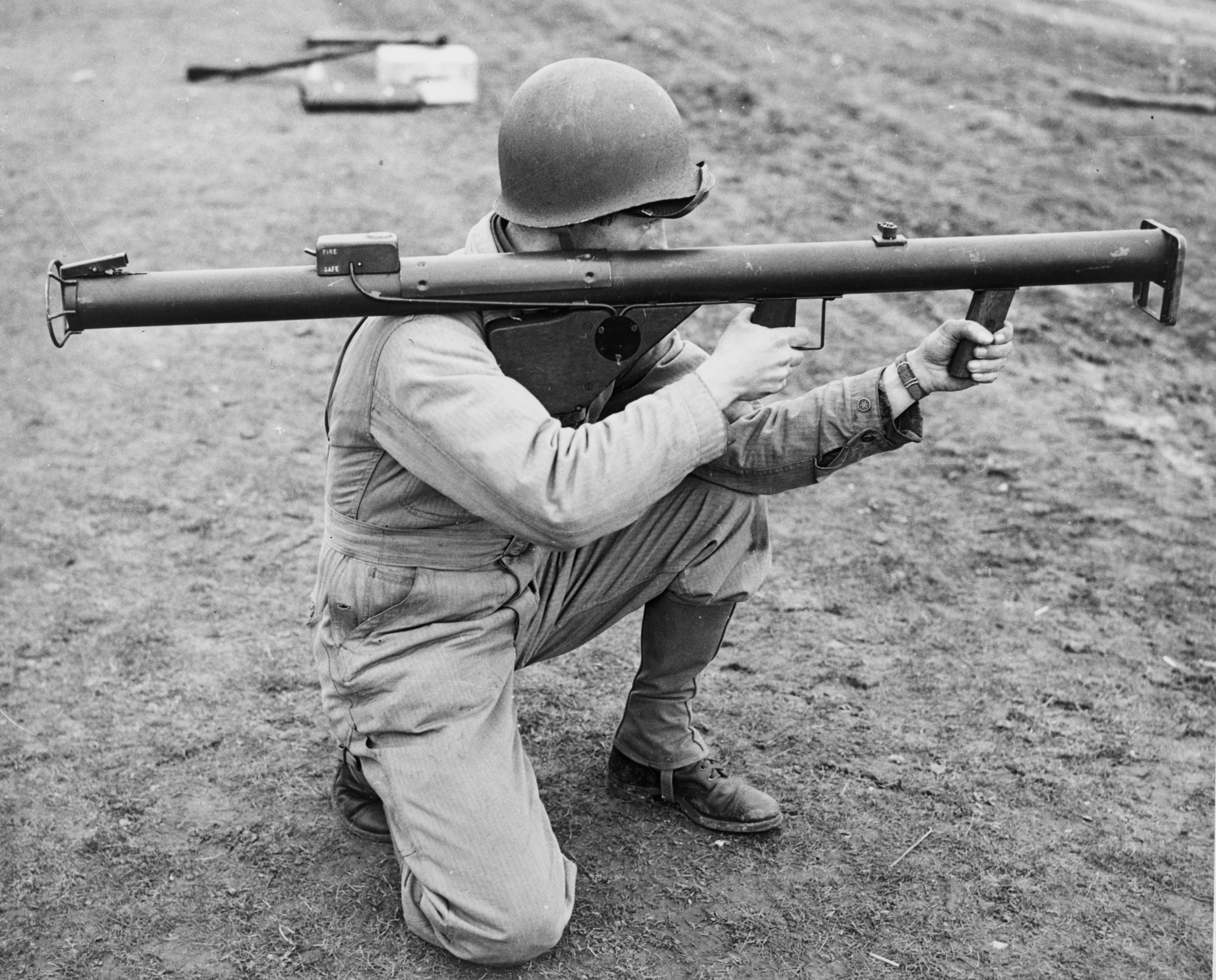
US soldier aims an M1 Bazooka during World War II

The rocket launchers category includes shoulder-fired weapons, any weapon that fires a rocket-propelled projectile at a target yet is small enough to be carried by a single person and fired while held on one's shoulder. Depending on the country or region, people might use the terms "bazooka" or "RPG" as generalized terms to refer to such weapons, both of which are in fact specific types of rocket launchers. The Bazooka was an American anti-tank weapon which was in service from 1942 to 1957, while the RPG (most commonly the RPG-7) is a Soviet anti-tank weapon. There are also shoulder-fired rocket launchers that compose an overall weapon system, such as the man-portable anti-tank system FGM-148 Javelin, which has a guided anti-tank rocket.

A smaller variation is the gyrojet, a small arms rocket launcher with ammunition slightly larger than that of a .45-caliber pistol.

Recoilless rifles are sometimes confused with rocket launchers. A recoilless rifle launches its projectile using an explosive powder charge, not a rocket engine, though some such systems have sustainer rocket motors.

=== Rocket pod ===
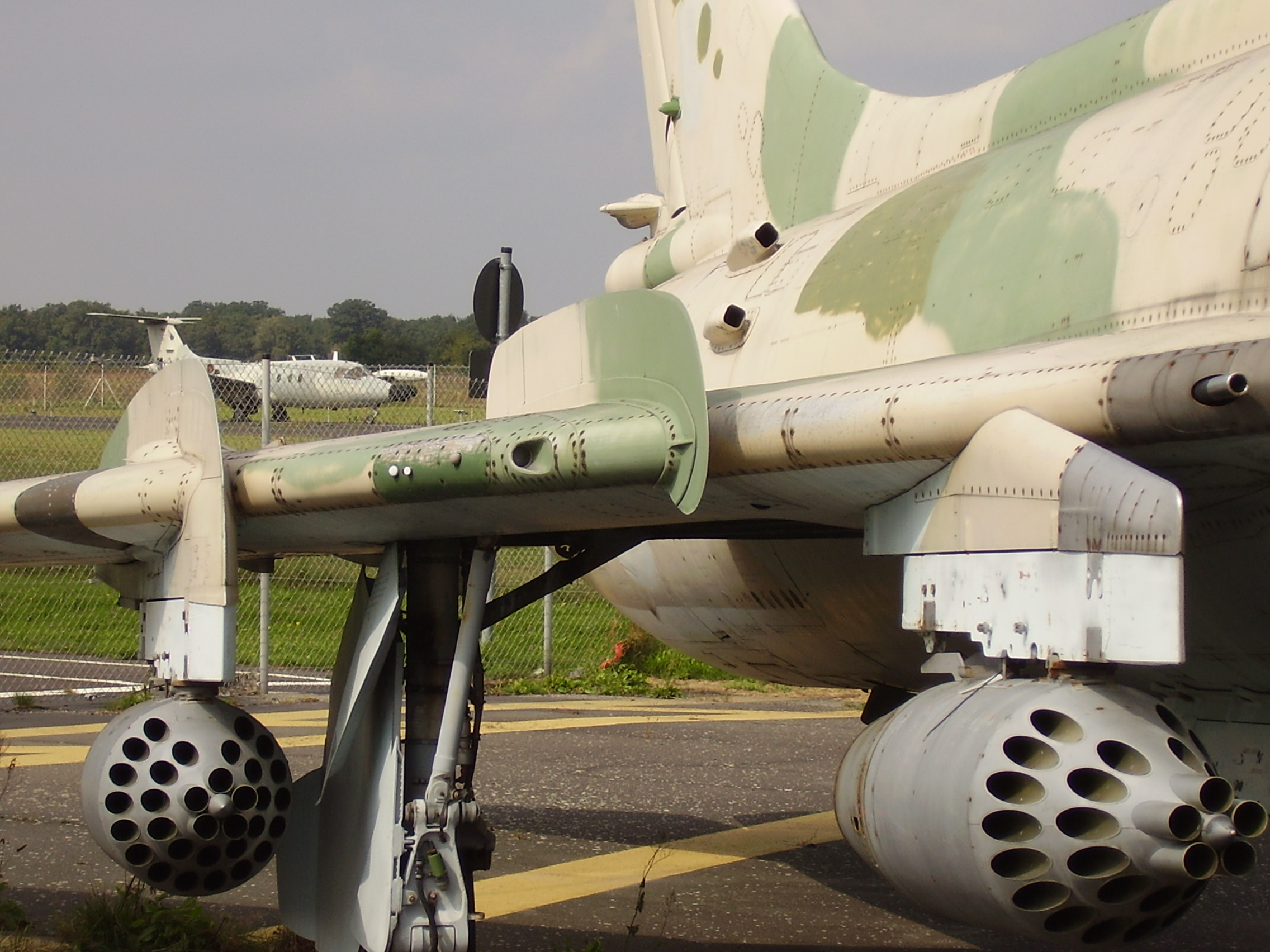
Su-20 aircraft with UB-32 rocket pods, each carrying thirty two S-5 rockets

A rocket pod is a launcher that contains several unguided rockets held in individual tubes, designed to be used by attack aircraft or attack helicopters for close air support. In many cases, rocket pods are streamlined to reduce aerodynamic drag. The first pods were developed immediately after World War II, as an improvement over the previous arrangement of firing rockets from rails, racks or tubes fixed under the wings of aircraft. Early examples of pod-launched rockets were the US Folding-Fin Aerial Rocket and the French SNEB.

=== Large scale ===
Larger-scale devices which serve to launch rockets include the multiple rocket launcher, a type of unguided rocket artillery system.

== Tactics and uses ==
A rocket launcher may be used for multiple purposes depending on what warhead is on the rocket to be launched.

=== Anti-tank ===
The original role of early modern rocket launchers is to destroy tanks. The warheads for destroying armor include high-explosive anti-tank (HEAT) warheads, which pierces holes in armour. Examples include the bazooka and the RPG-7 (if using a rocket designed to destroy tank armour, see also the armoured fighting vehicle section of the vehicle armour article).

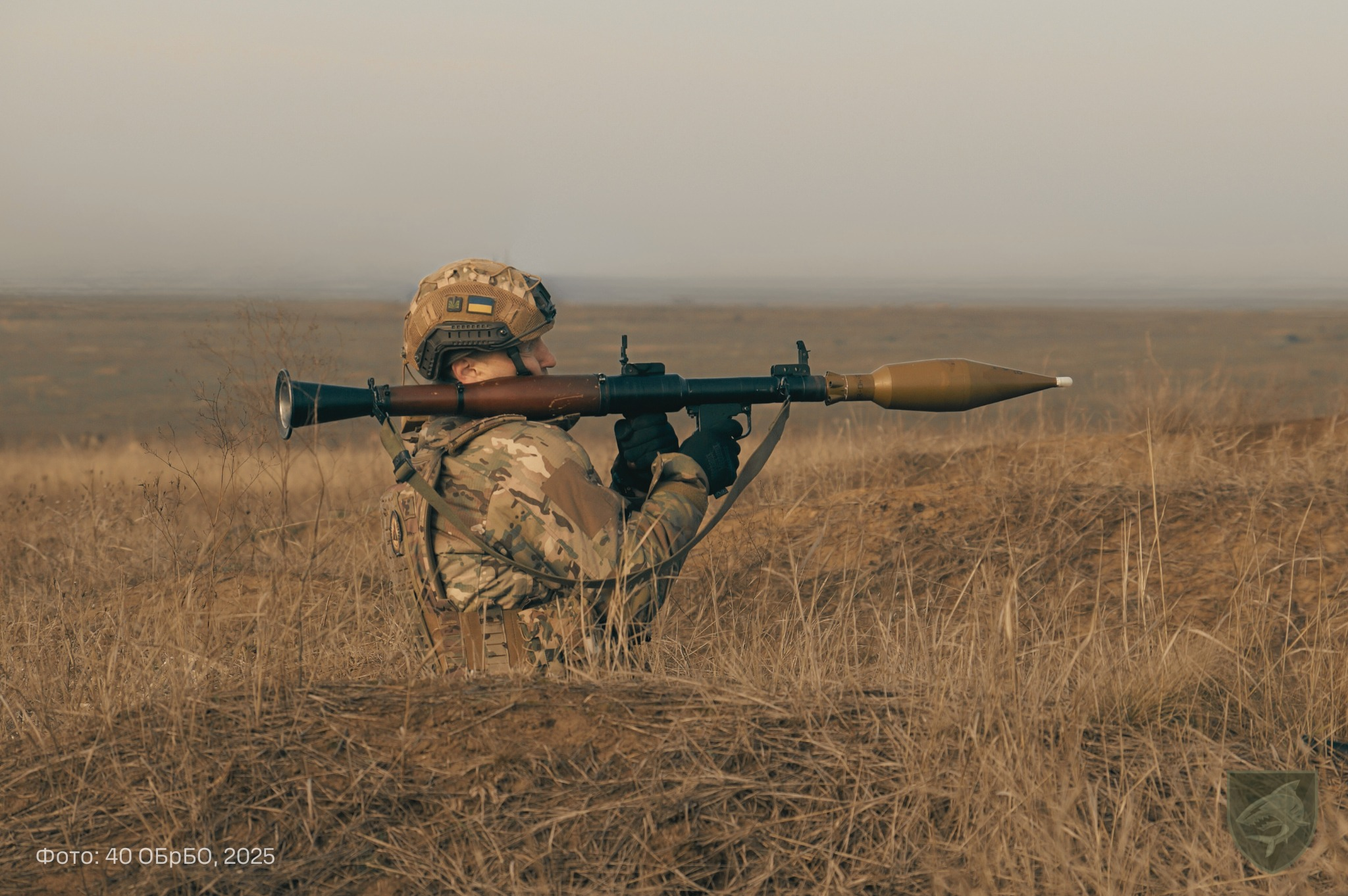
A Ukrainian marine with an RPG-7, a well known anti-tank weapon and rocket launcher.

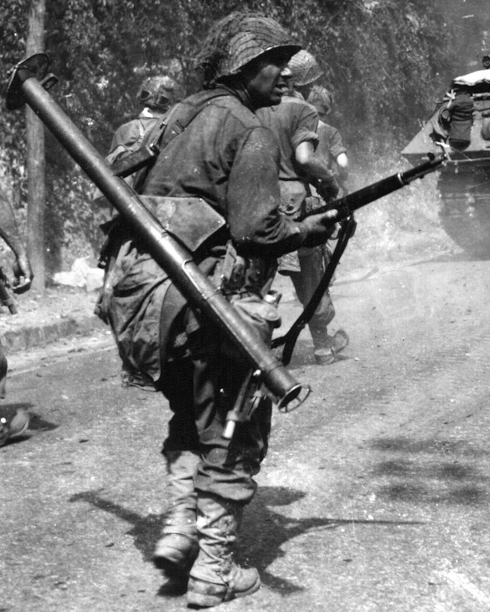
An American soldier with M1A1 Bazooka during World War II

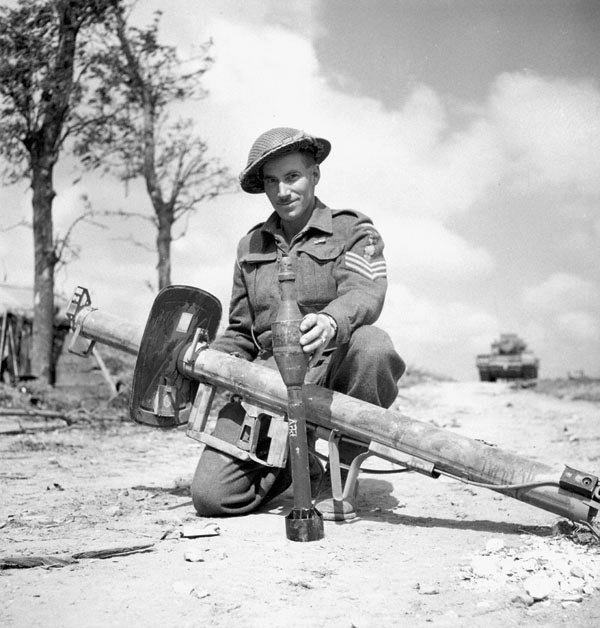
A Canadian sergeant showing a captured Panzerschreck, an anti-tank rocket-launcher used by Nazi Germany also during World War II

=== Anti-personnel ===
Rocket launchers may also be used to target personnel. For example, the RPG-7V1, a variant of the RPG-7, can be loaded with a rocket with a OG-7M, a fragmentation warhead, or a rocket containing a thermobaric TBG-7V, along with the armour piercing warhead-containing rockets compatible with this variant.

== See also ==
- Grenade launcher, weapons that also can launch explosive projectiles, but by propellant inside cartridges instead of rocket motors integrated into the projectile.
- Launch pad
- Recoilless rifle
- List of gun-launched missiles
- List of rocket launchers
- List of man-portable anti-tank systems MANPATS
