= Chenglingji =

Rock in Anhui, China

- Simplified Chinese: 城陵矶
- Traditional Chinese: 城陵磯
Transcriptions
Standard Mandarin
- Hanyu Pinyin: Chénglíng jī

Chenglingji (simplified Chinese: 城陵矶; traditional Chinese: 城陵磯; pinyin: Chénglíng jī) is a large rock located at the confluence of Dongting Lake and the Yangtze, within Yueyanglou District, Yueyang, Hunan. It is one of the three most famous rocks in the Yangtze, together with Caishi Rock and Swallow Rock. Nowadays, Chenglingji Port located here is the largest port in Hunan, and a major stop for traffic in Hunan as well as along the Yangtze.

== Geography ==
Chenglingji is located on the southern bank of the Yangtze, and towards the east of the discharge channel of Dongting Lake. Bajiao Lake is located towards the east.

Chenglingji Hydrological Station is an important hydrological station on the course of the Yangtze. Beginning in 1904, records of water levels were taken regularly here, making it the longest serving hydrological station on the Yangtze, on par with Hankou Hydrological Station. The water level at Chenglingji is taken as a reference for the severity of the Yangtze floods, such as in 1954 and 1998. The water level of 33.0 meters is the alert level for flooding in the Dongting Lake and midstream Yangtze regions.

In 1979, the Baiji was still able to be seen around here. In 1992, one of the five Baiji Protection Stations was established here at Chenglingji.

== History ==
Since the Northern Wei Dynasty (386-534 AD), Chengling Rock was already documented:

江之右岸有城陵山，山有古城。
On the right [south] bank of the Yangtze, there exists Chengling Hill, with an old city there.

— 水经注 Commentary on the Water Classic, Northern Wei Dynasty,

By the Ming Dynasty, it was a bustling city of trade, and was nicknamed "Little Nanjing" by people in the region. During the Xianfeng era, the value of tea leaves from Hunan and Hubei handled by the port was worth 10 million taels of silver.

== Port ==
The port at Yuezhou (today's Yueyang, Hunan) was established by decree in the 25th year of the Guangxu era (1899 AD). The port was located at Chenglingji, and served as the main trade connection between the Yangtze and Xiang River with the wider world.

The modern Chenglingji Port was opened in 1956, and in 1980 was promoted as a National-level Port of Entry, allowing foreign ships to dock and enter China. Currently, it remains the only river port in Hunan open to foreign ships. There are 10 docks, and the port is allowed to run after sunset. It has an area of 5.8 km^{2}. It is also connected by railway onto the Beijing-Guangzhou railway.

== See also ==
- Caishi Rock
- Swallow Rock
- Yueyanglou, Yueyang
- Yueyang
- Yangtze
- Dongting Lake
