= Huo Che =

Chinese multiple rocket launcher

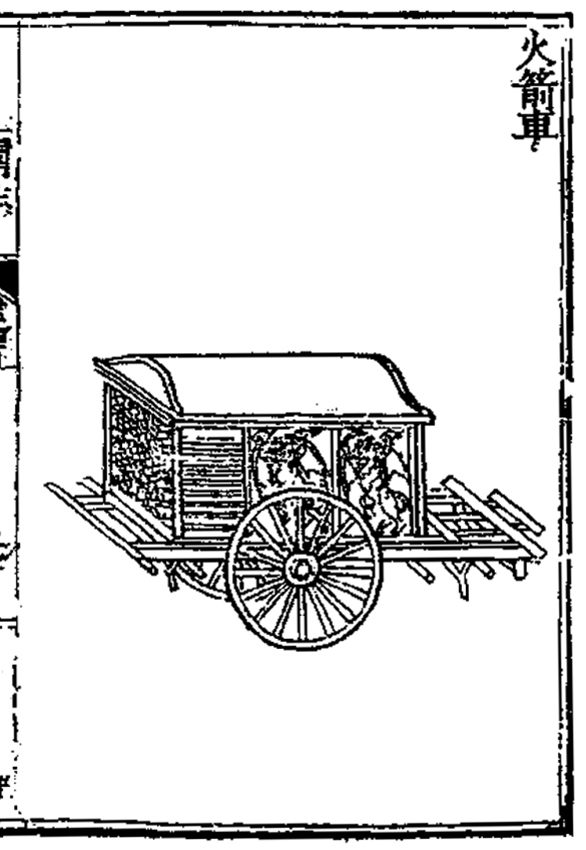
Rocket cart illustrated in Si Zhen San Guan Zhi

Huo Che (Chinese: 火車) or rocket carts (Chinese: 火箭車) are several types of Chinese multiple rocket launcher developed for firing multiple fire arrows. The name Huo Che first appears in Feng Tian Jing Nan Ji (Chinese: 奉天靖難紀), a historical text covering the Jingnan War (1399 – 1402) of Ming dynasty.

== History ==
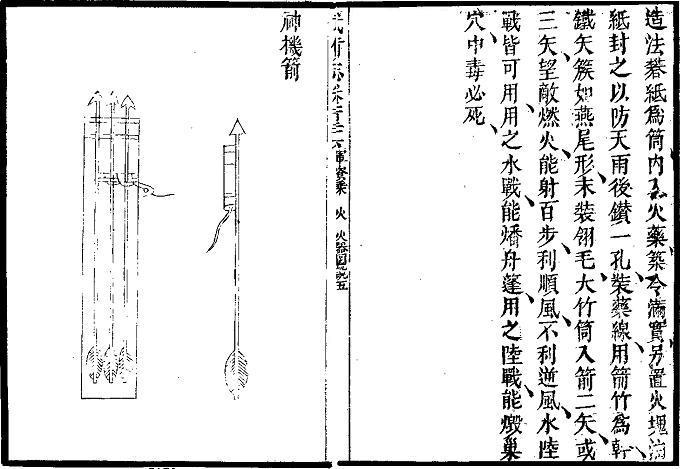
Depiction of rocket arrows known as "divine engine arrows" (shen ji jian 神機箭) from the Wubei Zhi.

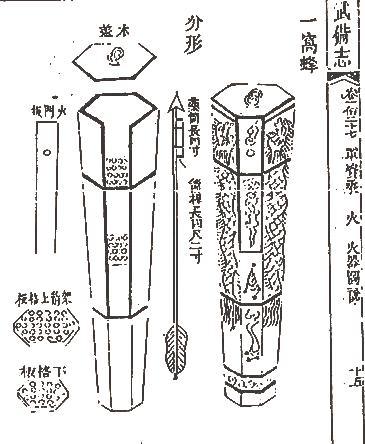
A "nest of bees" (yi wo feng 一窩蜂) rocket arrow launcher as depicted in the Wubei Zhi. So called because of its hexagonal honeycomb shape.

The dating of the invention of the first rocket, otherwise known as the gunpowder propelled fire arrow, is disputed. The History of Song attributes the invention to two different people at different times, Feng Zhisheng in 969 and Tang Fu in 1000. However Joseph Needham argues that rockets could not have existed before the 12th century, since the gunpowder formulas listed in the Wujing Zongyao are not suitable as rocket propellant.

Rockets may have been used as early as 1232, when reports appeared describing fire arrows and 'iron pots' that could be heard for 5 leagues (25 km, or 15 miles) when they exploded upon impact, causing devastation for a radius of 600 meters (2,000 feet), apparently due to shrapnel. A "flying fire-lance" that had re-usable barrels was also mentioned to have been used by the Jin dynasty (1115–1234). Rockets are recorded to have been used by the Song navy in a military exercise dated to 1245. Internal-combustion rocket propulsion is mentioned in a reference to 1264, recording that the 'ground-rat,' a type of firework, had frightened the Empress-Mother Gongsheng at a feast held in her honor by her son the Emperor Lizong.

Subsequently, rockets are included in the military treatise Huolongjing, also known as the Fire Drake Manual, written by the Chinese artillery officer Jiao Yu in the mid-14th century. This text mentions the first known multistage rocket, the 'fire-dragon issuing from the water' (huo long chu shui), thought to have been used by the Chinese navy.

Rocket launchers known as "nest of bees" were ordered by the Ming army in 1380. In 1400, the Ming loyalist Li Jinglong used rocket launchers against the army of Zhu Di (Yongle Emperor).

The American historian Frank H. Winter proposed in The Proceedings of the Twentieth and Twenty-First History Symposia of the International Academy of Astronautics that southern China and the Laotian community rocket festivals might have been key in the subsequent spread of rocketry in the Orient.

As multiple rocket launchers, rocket carts were used in the Ming dynasty in the Jingnan War (1399 – 1402) and were carried on the ships of Zheng He (1371 – 1433) during his voyages to India and Africa. Huo Ches were primarily used in a defensive manner for close-range infantry support.

== Variants ==
=== Huo Che ===
Fire cart (Chinese: 火車; lit. 'fire cart'): A fire arrow engine deployed in Jingnan War, recorded in Feng Tian Jing Nan Ji.

=== Jiahuo zhanche ===
Wheelbarrow fire engine (Chinese: 架火戰車; pinyin: Jià huǒ zhàn chē; lit. 'rocket chariot'): Multiple rocket launcher supported by a wheelbarrow cart, recorded in Wubei Zhi. The frame of the cart can be attached to variable sizes of rocket pods, including Chang She Po Di Jian (Chinese: 長蛇破敵箭) with 30 rockets per pod, and Bai Hu Qi Ben Jian (Chinese: 百虎齊奔箭) with 100 rockets per pod.

=== Huojianche ===
Huojianche (Chinese: 火箭車; pinyin: Huǒjiàn chē): It's a type of multiple rocket launcher supported by a two-wheeled cart, recorded in Si Zhen San Guan Zhi.

== Gallery ==
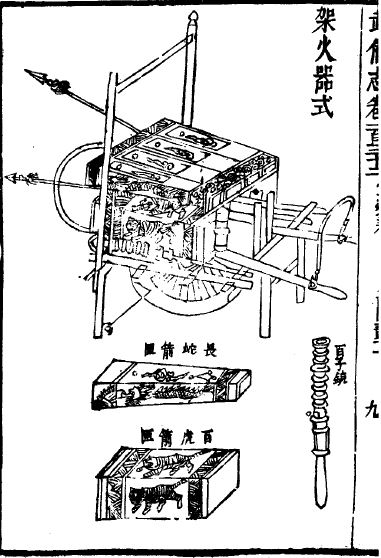
A 'wheelbarrow fire engine' (架火戰車 jia huo zhan che) constructed by joining together four 'long serpent' rocket launchers, two square 'hundred tigers' rocket-arrow launchers, two multiple-bullet emitters, and two spears for close quarter combat.

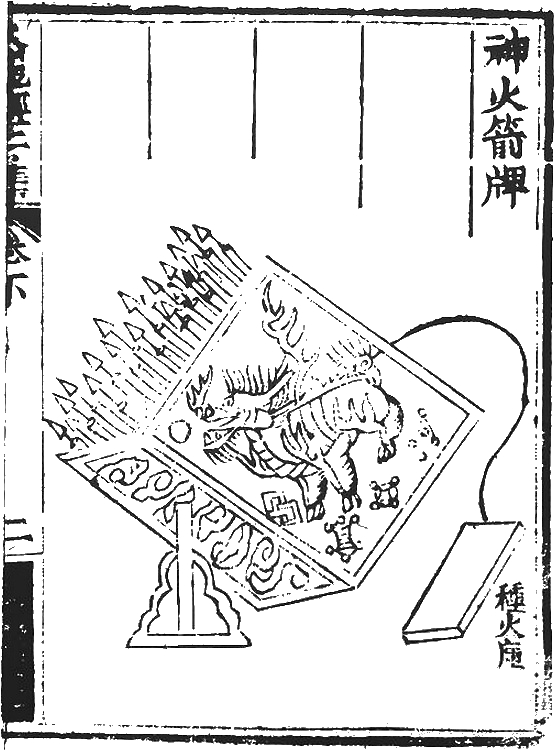
A 'divine fire arrow shield' (神火箭牌 shen huo jian pai). Depiction of a stationary, defensive, fire arrow rocket launcher from the Huolongjing.

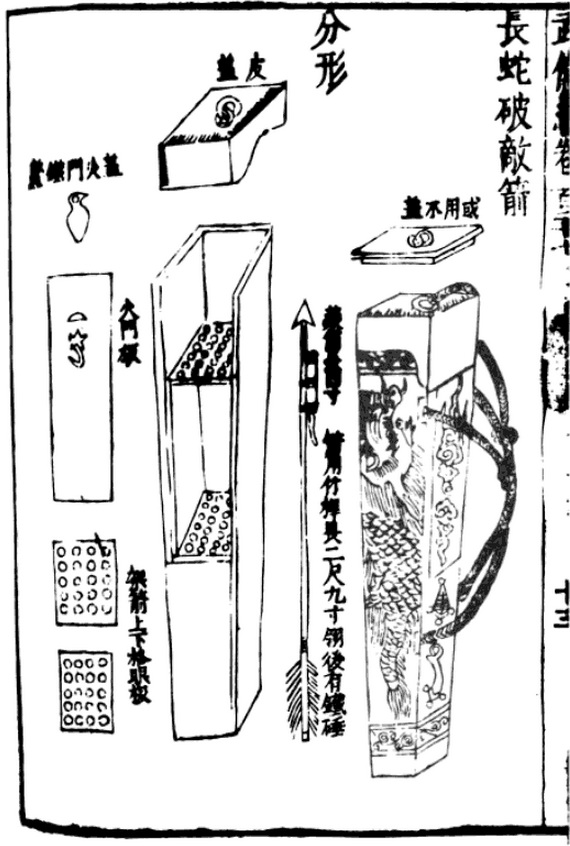
A 'long serpent enemy breaking" fire arrow launcher (長蛇破敵箭 Chang She Po Di Jian) as depicted in the Wubei Zhi. It can be attached to Wheelbarrow fire engine (Jiahuo zhanche), or carried with a sling on the back.

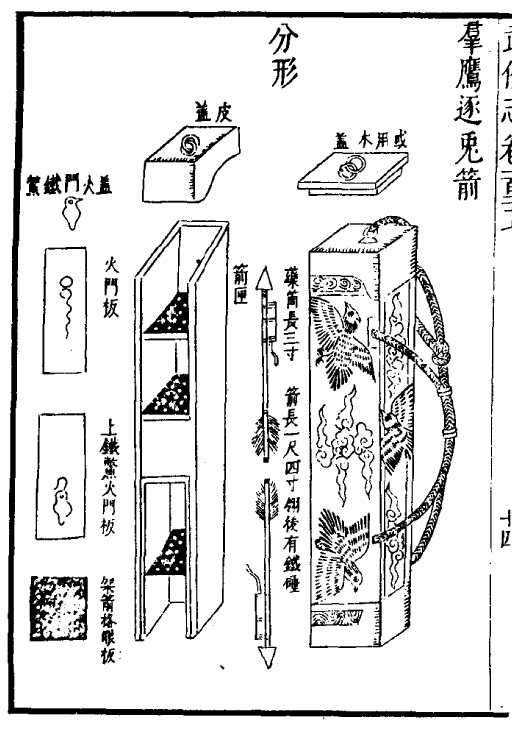
The 'convocation of eagles chasing hare arrow' from the Wubei Zhi. A double ended rocket arrow pod that carries 30 small poisoned rocket arrows on each end for a total of 60 rocket arrows. It carries a sling for transport.

== Bibliography ==
- Lorge, Peter (2005), Warfare in China to 1600, Routledge
- Lorge, Peter A. (2008), The Asian Military Revolution: from Gunpowder to the Bomb, Cambridge University Press, ISBN 978-0-521-60954-8
- Needham, Joseph (1980), Science & Civilisation in China, vol. 5 pt. 4, Cambridge University Press, ISBN 0-521-08573-X
- Needham, Joseph (1986), Science & Civilisation in China, vol. V:7: The Gunpowder Epic, Cambridge University Press, ISBN 0-521-30358-3.

== See also ==
- Hwacha
- Fire arrow
- Ribauldequin
- Huolongjing
- Wubei Zhi
