= Chen Kangbo =

Song dynasty prime minister

Chen Kangbo (陳康伯) was a chancellor of the Southern Song dynasty and chief strategist for the Song victory against the Jin in the Battle of Caishi. He served as a military supervisor and naval commander.

== Battle of Caishi ==
Chen was the chief architect of the Song strategy and victory at Caishi. Another account tells of how General Chen Lugong (Chen Kangbo) led naval regiments to defeat the Jin and defend the Song.

== See also ==
- Battle of Caishi
