= Tang Fu =

Song dynasty naval captain and inventor

Tang Fu (唐福) was a Chinese inventor, military engineer, and naval captain who lived during the Song dynasty. Although he did not invent the fire arrow, an early form of gunpowder rocket, he is credited as having invented "a rocket of a new style having a head of iron." According to William Alexander Parsons Martin, this invention represents a "transition from signal rockets to firearms, properly so called." This happened in 1000 AD, while Tang Fu served as a naval captain. His name is mentioned in the Chinese texts, the History of Song or Songshi and the Ko Chieh Ching Yuan or The Mirror of Research. In the History of Song, he is said to have "presented his fire arrows, fire balls and grenades."
