= Swallow Rock =

Scenic area in Nanjing, Jiangsu Province, China

Coordinates: 32.147°N 118.817°E

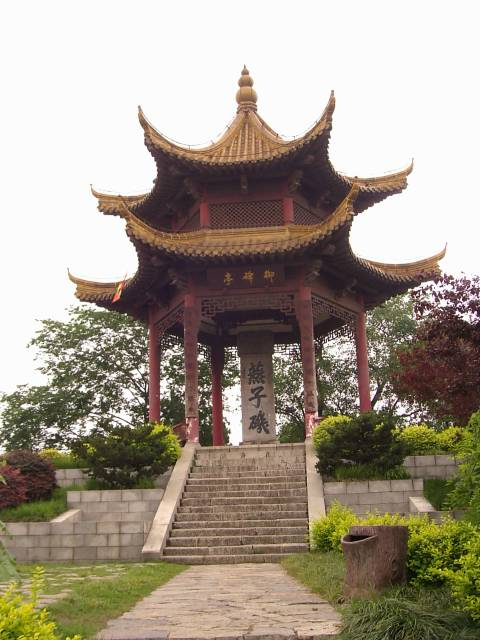
Qianlong Stele Pavilion at Swallow Rock

Swallow Rock (simplified Chinese: 燕子矶; traditional Chinese: 燕子磯; pinyin: Yànzi Jī) is a small scenic area in the northwest part of Nanjing, Jiangsu Province, China which is one of the 48 scenic areas in Nanjing. Standing at 36 metres in the Yangtze River, the Swallow Rock is shaped like a flying swallow and is also one of three famous rocks in Nanjing. Li Bai is thought to have visited and written a poem about Swallow Rock.

Swallow Rock is also of minor historical interest for several unrelated events. In the Qing dynasty, when the Qianlong Emperor went on an inspection tour in the Jiangnan region, he passed Swallow Rock and left a poem here and that is now displayed on the rocks. A pavilion with a stone tablet in it stands on the top of the rock.

A small monument marks this as one of the sites where the citizens of Nanjing were slaughtered by the Japanese during the Nanjing Massacre in 1937–38.

A station on the Nanjing Metro is named after Swallow Rock.
