= Yu Yunwen =

Yu Yunwen (Chinese: 虞允文; pinyin: Yú Yǔnwén; 1110–1174) was a Chinese official and general of the Song dynasty. He fought in the Jin–Song wars and led the Song forces in the Battle of Caishi against an army of the Jurchen-led Jin dynasty.
