= Heilongjiang hand cannon =

Chinese bronze firearm dated to 1287

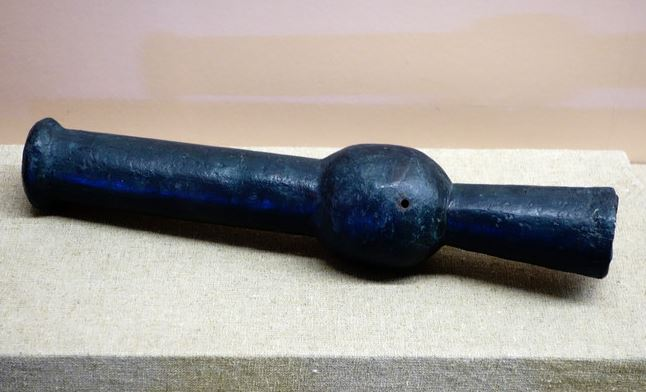
The Heilongjiang hand cannon (in 2021), a hand cannon dated to 1288 based on its proximity to a battle between the rebel prince Nayan and Yuan dynasty forces armed with hand cannons

The Heilongjiang hand cannon or hand-gun is a bronze hand cannon manufactured no later than 1288 and is the world's oldest confirmed surviving firearm. It weighs 3.55 kg (7.83 pounds) and is 34 centimeters (13.4 inches) long. The Heilongjiang hand cannon was excavated during the 1970s in Banlachengzi, a village in Acheng District, Heilongjiang province, China. It was found alongside other bronze artifacts made in the style of the Jurchen Jin Dynasty (12th–13th century). The hand cannon was probably used in battles fought nearby in Banlachengzi in 1287 and 1288. The History of Yuan states that a Jurchen commander by the name of Li Ting led a group of soldiers equipped with hand cannons into a military camp in 1288, as part of an anti-rebellion campaign for the Yuan dynasty. The cannon currently resides at the Heilongjiang Provincial Museum in Harbin, China.

== Description ==
The Heilongjiang hand cannon is 34 centimeters (13.4 in) long without a handle and weighs 3.55 kg (7.83 pounds). The diameter of the interior at the end of the barrel is 2.6 cm (1.02 inches). The barrel is the lengthiest part of the hand cannon and is 17.5 cm (6.9 inches) long. There is no inscription on the hand cannon.

The hand cannon has a bulbous base at the breech called the yaoshi (藥室) or gunpowder chamber, where the explosion that propels the projectile occurs. The diameter of the Heilongjiang hand-guns powder chamber is 6.6 cm (2.6 inches). The walls of the powder chamber are noticeably thicker to better withstand the explosive pressure of the gunpowder. The powder chamber also has a touch hole, a small hole for the fuse that ignites the gunpowder. Behind the gunpowder chamber is a socket shaped like a trumpet where the handle of the hand cannon is inserted. The bulbous shape of the base gave the earliest Chinese and Western cannons a vase-like or pear-like appearance, which gradually disappeared when advancements in metallurgical technology made the bulbous base obsolete.

== Historical context ==
Gunpowder was invented in China during the 9th century. One of the first references to gunpowder occurs in the Taoist alchemical text known as Zhenyuan miaodao yaolüe (真元妙道要略), composed during the mid-800s, containing a passage mentioning the use of gunpowder. By the 12th century, Song dynasty forces were utilizing gunpowder weapons such as fire lances, grenades, and metal bombards. Exploding gunpowder bombs were used as early as 1126 during the Jingkang Incident, when the Jurchen Jin dynasty besieged the Song capital of Kaifeng. The Song defenders launched explosive bombs called pili pao (霹雳炮) at the besiegers.

The predecessor of the hand cannon, the fire lance, was a spear tied with a bamboo or paper barrel that could fire projectiles. The transition between the fire lance to the cannon or hand cannon was gradual, so literary references to a weapon called huotong (火筒; "fire tube") can either denote fire lances or metal-barrel firearms. The Xingjun Xuzhi (行軍須知; "What an Army Commander in the Field ought to Know") dated 1230, lists huotong among other gunpowder weapons, but may refer to either a fire lance or a hand cannon. This has been attested to by surviving metal cannons and hand cannons in China from the 13th and 14th centuries.

The oldest among the excavated cannons is the Wuwei cannon dated to 1227. It was discovered in Wuwei, Gansu and likely originates from the Western Xia period. The Wuwei cannon weighs 108.5 kilograms (239 pounds), a diameter of 12 centimeters (4.7 inches), and a length of 1 meter (3 feet 3 3/8 inches). An iron cannonball and a small quantity of gunpowder were also discovered at the Wuwei archaeological site.

The earliest cannon inscribed with a date of manufacture is a bronze cannon. It is dated to 1298 according to an inscription in the 'Phags-pa script. Outside of archaeological finds, appearances of the cannon in Chinese art may suggest that the cannon was invented as early as the 12th century. The oldest artistic representation of a cannon is a stone relief sculpture dated to 1128. The sculpture was discovered in 1985 carved in the walls of Cave 149 of the Dazu Rock Carvings in Dazu, Chongqing.

The Heilongjiang hand-gun is dated to 1288. At 3.55 kg (7.83 pounds) and is considerably lighter than older projectile devices such as the bulky trebuchets that were used to launch explosive bombs. Since the earliest textual reference to a "huo chong," or "fire tube," is dated to 1230 and the oldest surviving hand cannon is dated to 1288, the invention of the hand cannon likely occurred in the mid-13th century. The invention of the metal-barrel hand cannon in China did not diminish the popularity of the earlier bamboo-barrel fire lances. The fire lance was cheaper and more portable than the hand cannon and was still used in China until the 16th century when the musket replaced the fire lance.

== Excavation and dating ==
The hand cannon was discovered in July 1970 at an archaeological site in Banlachengzi village (半拉城子). The village is situated on the shores of the Ashi River in Harbin's Acheng District.

The archaeologists discovered several bronze objects that were excavated with the hand cannon. The excavated objects were a bronze vase, a bronze mirror, and a bronze cooking pan. All the bronze artifacts were manufactured in the style of the Jurchen Jin dynasty. The Jin dynasty collapsed after the Mongols besieged and captured Caizhou in 1234, which suggests that the Heilongjiang hand-gun can reasonably be dated to the 13th century at the latest.

The dating of the Heilongjiang hand-gun is based on battles in 1287 and 1288 that were fought near the site where the archaeologists discovered the hand-gun. The battles were part of Mongol prince Nayan's rebellion in Manchuria against Kublai Khan, the emperor of the Yuan dynasty. An account of the 1287 and 1288 battles is documented in the History of Yuan, which references the use of hand cannons.

In 1287, a group of soldiers equipped with hand cannons led by commander Li Ting (李庭) attacked Nayan's camp. The History of Yuan reports that the hand cannons not only "caused great damage," but also caused "such confusion that the enemy soldiers attacked and killed each other." The hand cannons were used again at the beginning of 1288. Li Ting's "gun-soldiers" or chongzu (銃卒) were able to carry the hand cannons "on their backs" according to the History of Yuan. The passage on the 1288 battle is also the first to coin the name chong (銃) for metal-barrel firearms. Chong was used instead of the earlier and more ambiguous term huo tong (火筒), which may refer to the tubes of fire lances, proto-cannons, or signal flares.

Wei Guozhong (魏國忠) was the archaeologist who excavated and dated the cannon. He wrote a description of the archaeological find in the article "A Bronze Bombard Excavated at Banlachengzi in Acheng Xian in Heilongjiang Province," which was published in 1973 for the journal Reference Materials for History and Archaeology. Wei proposed a connection between the hand cannon discovered in Banlachengzi and the nearby battle sites. The historian Joseph Needham remarked that Wei's "find will long remain of capital importance since it is the only metal-barrel hand-gun so far discovered which almost certainly belongs to the 13th century."

== See also ==
- Gunpowder weapons in the Song dynasty
- Hu dun pao
- Huochong
- Military of the Yuan dynasty
- Wuwei Bronze Cannon
- Xanadu gun

== Notes ==
a: Hand-gun is an alternative name for the hand cannon and should not be confused with modern handguns. Particularly in British English, the term hand-gun refers to historical cannons that could be carried by a single individual due to their small size.
b: The journal was later renamed Culture Relics (文物).

== Bibliography ==
- Chase, Kenneth Warren (2003). Firearms: A Global History to 1700. Cambridge University Press. ISBN 978-0-521-82274-9.
- Franke, Herbert (1994). "The Chin dynasty". In Twitchett, Denis C.; Herbert Franke; John King Fairbank (eds.). The Cambridge History of China: Volume 6, Alien Regimes and Border States, 710–1368. Cambridge University Press. pp. 215–320. ISBN 978-0-521-24331-5.
- Haw, Stephen G. (July 2013). "The Mongol Empire – The First 'Gunpowder Empire'?". Journal of the Royal Asiatic Society. 23 (3): 441–469. doi:10.1017/S1356186313000369. S2CID 162200994.
- Lorge, Peter (2008). The Asian Military Revolution: From Gunpowder to the Bomb. Cambridge University Press. ISBN 978-0-521-84682-0.
- Needham, Joseph (1987). Science and Civilisation in China: Military Technology: The Gunpowder Epic, Volume 5, Part 7. Cambridge University Press. ISBN 978-0-521-30358-3.
- Parker, Geoffrey (1995). "The Gunpowder Revolution". The Cambridge Illustrated History of Warfare. Cambridge University Press. pp. 106–119. ISBN 978-0-521-73806-4.
- Rossabi, Morris (1988). Khubilai Khan: His Life and Times. Los Angeles: University of California Press. ISBN 978-0-520-06740-0.
