= Fierce-fire Oil Cabinet =

Ancient Chinese double-piston pump naphtha flamethrower

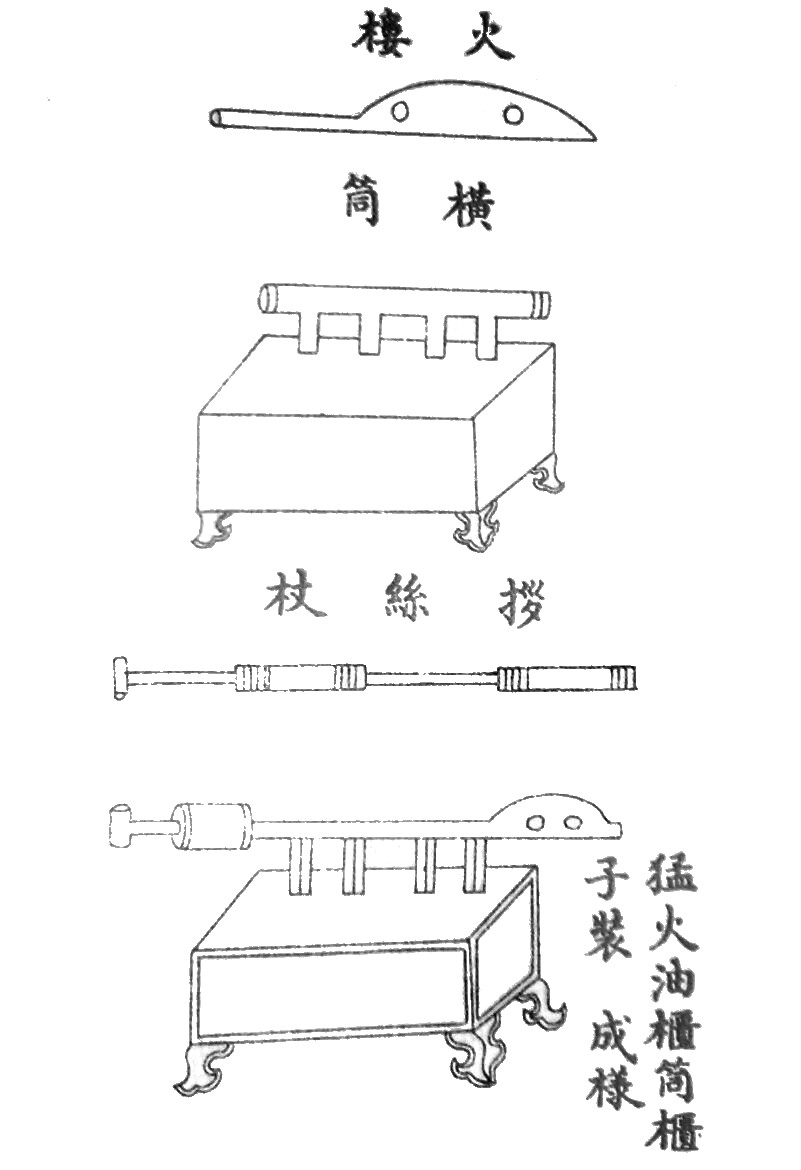
A Chinese flamethrower from the Wujing Zongyao manuscript of 1044 AD, Song dynasty. The text reads from top to bottom: ignition chamber, horizontal tank, piston rod, and fierce-fire oil tank cabinet installed form.

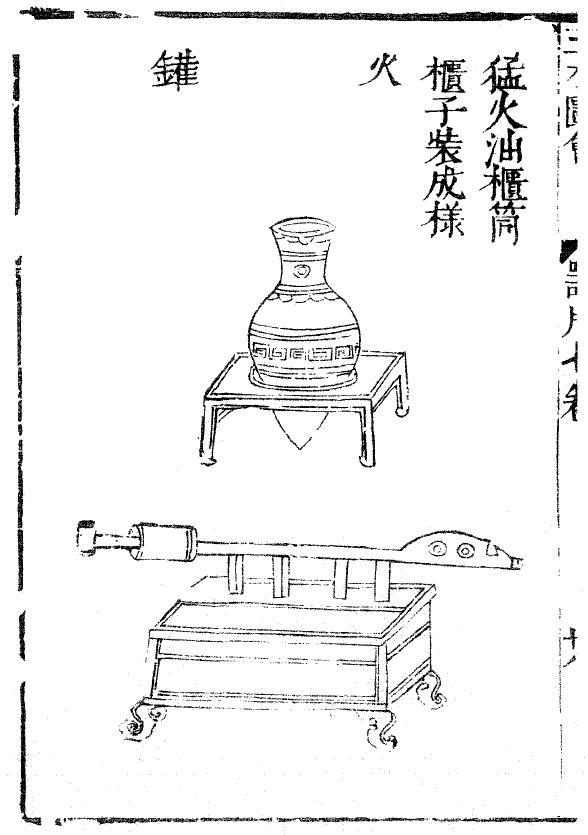
From the Sancai Tuhui, 1609.

The Fierce-fire Oil Cabinet (Chinese: 喷火器; pinyin: pēnhuǒqì; lit. ''fire spraying device'') was a double-piston pump naphtha flamethrower first recorded to have been used in 919 AD in China, during the Five Dynasties and Ten Kingdoms period.

== Wu Renchen and Khitan Liao dynasty ==
Petroleum had been used in China since the late Zhou dynasty in 5th century BC, but the distilled fierce fire oil, otherwise known as petrol or Greek fire in the west, was not used until the 10th century AD. According to Wu Renchen's Spring and Autumn Annals of the Ten Kingdoms, in 917 AD, the king of Wuyue sent fierce fire oil to the Khitans as a gift. The envoy explained that it could be used to attack cities and the Khitan ruler was delighted.

The History of Liao gives an extended version of the account:

The ruler of Wu State sent to Abaoji, ruler of the Qidan (Liao), a quantity of furious fiery oil (meng huoyou) which on being set alight and coming in contact with water blazed all the more fiercely. It could be used in attacking cities. Tai Zu (Abaoji) was delighted, and at once got ready a cavalry force thirty thousand strong with the intention of attacking Youzhou. But his queen, Shulü laughed and said: 'Whoever heard of attacking a country with oil? Would it not be better to take three thousand horse and lie in wait on the borders, laying waste the country, so that the city will be starved out? By that means they will be brought to straits infallibly, even though it takes a few years. So why all this haste? Take care lest you be worsted, so that the [Han Chinese] mock at us, and our own people fall away.' Therefore he went no further in his design.

— History of Liao

== Qian Chuanguan ==
According to the Wu-Yue Beishi (吳越備史, "The History of Wu and Yue"), the next appearance of fierce fire oil occurred in 919 AD when the two fleets of Wuyue and Wu met in battle. In the Battle of Langshan Jiang (Wolf Mountain River), the Wuyue fleet under Qian Chuanguan brought with them more than 500 dragon-like battleships and used "fire oil" to burn the enemy fleet. It was a great victory and they destroyed more than 400 enemy ships as well as capturing more than 7,000 men. The text goes on to explain appearance of the new weapon and the device used to deploy it:

What is 'fire oil'? It comes from Arabia (Dashi Guo) in the southern seas. It is spouted forth from iron tubes. and when meeting with water or wet things it gives forth flame and smoke even more abundantly. Wusu Wang used to decorate the mouths of the tubes with silver, so that if (the tank and tube) fell into the hands of the enemy, they would scrape off the silver and reject the rest of the apparatus. So the fire oil itself would not get into their hands (and could be recovered later).

— The History of Wu and Yue

== Wujing Zongyao ==
The British biochemist and historian Joseph Needham believes that if the flamethrower used in 919 AD was of the same design as the one described in the later Wujing Zongyao in 1044, then it is also by implication the earliest known use of the slow match. Therefore, also one of the first military applications of gunpowder. The following is a description of the flamethrower as provided by the Wujing Zongyao:

On the right is the petrol flamethrower (lit. fierce fire oil-shooter, fang meng huo you). The tank is made of brass (shou tong), and supported on four legs. From its upper surface arise four (vertical) tubes attached to a horizontal cylinder (ju tong) above; they are all connected with the tank. The head and the tail of the cylinder are large (the middle) is of narrow (diameter). In the tail end there is a small opening as big as a millet grain. The head end has (two) round openings 1½ inches in diameter. At the side of the tank there is a hole with a (little) tube which is used for filling, and this is fitted with a cover. Inside the cylinder there is a (piston-)rod packed with silk floss (za si zhang), the head of which is wound round with hemp waste about ½ inches thick. Before and behind, the two communicating tubes are (alternately) occluded (lit. controlled, shu), and (the mechanism) thus determined. The tail has a horizontal handle (the pump handle), in front of which there is a round cover. When (the handle is pushed) in (the pistons) close the mouth of the tubes (in turn).

Before use the tank is filled with rather more than three catties of the oil with a spoon through a filter (sha luo); at the same time gunpowder (composition) (huo yao) is placed in the ignition chamber (huo lou) at the head. When the fire is to be started one applies a heated branding iron (to the ignition chamber), and the piston-rod is forced fully into the cylinder—then the man at the back is ordered to draw the piston rod (za zhang) fully backwards and work it (back and forth) as vigorously as possible. Whereupon the oil (the petrol) comes out through the ignition chamber and is shot forth as blazing flame.

Whereupon the oil (the petrol) comes out through the ignition-chamber and is shot forth as blazing flame. When filling, use the bowl, the spoon and the filter; for igniting there is the branding-iron; for maintaining (or renewing) the fire there is the container (guan). The branding-iron is made sharp like an awl so that it may be used to unblock the tubes if they get stopped up. There are tongs with which to pick up the glowing fire, and there is a soldering-iron for stopping-up leaks.

[Comm. If the tank or the tubes get cracked and leak they may be mended by using green wax. Altogether there are 12 items of equipment, all of brass except the tongs, the branding-iron and the soldering-iron.]

Another method is to fix a brass gourd-shaped container inside a large tube; below it has two feet, and inside there are two small feet communicating with them.

[Comm. all made of brass],

and there is also the piston (za si zhang). The method of shooting is as described above.

If the enemy comes to attack a city, these weapons are placed on the great ramparts, or else in outworks, so that large numbers of assailants cannot get through.

— Wujing Zongyao

Flamethrowers were also recorded to have been used in 976 AD when Song naval forces confronted the Southern Tang fleet on the Changjiang. Southern Tang forces attempted to use flamethrowers against the Song navy, but were accidentally consumed by their own fire when violent winds swept in their direction. The flamethrower was a well known device by the 11th century when it was joked that Confucian scholars knew it better than the classics. Both gunpowder and the fierce fire oil were produced under the Arsenals Administration of the Song dynasty. In the early 12th century AD, Kang Yuzhi recorded his memories of military commanders testing out fierce oil fire on a small lakelet. They would spray it about on the opposite bank that represented the enemy camp. The flames would ignite into a sheet of flame, destroying the wooden fortifications, and even killing the water plants, fishes and turtles.

In 1126 AD, the Song dynasty used flamethrowers in an attempt to prevent the Jurchen Jin dynasty army from crossing the Yellow River. Illustrations and descriptions of mobile flamethrowers on four-wheeled push carts were documented in the Wujing Zongyao, written in 1044 AD (its illustration redrawn in 1601 as well).

== Bibliography ==
- Needham, Joseph (1986), Science & Civilisation in China, vol. V:5, Part 7: The Gunpowder Epic, Cambridge University Press, ISBN 0-521-30358-3.
