= Hu dun pao =

Classical Chinese missile weapon

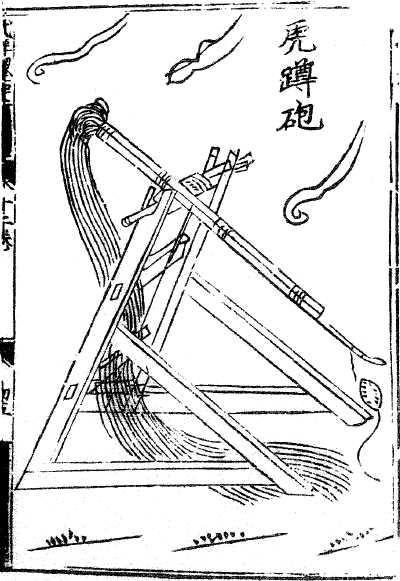
Hu dun pao as a trebuchet, from Wujing Zongyao (1044)

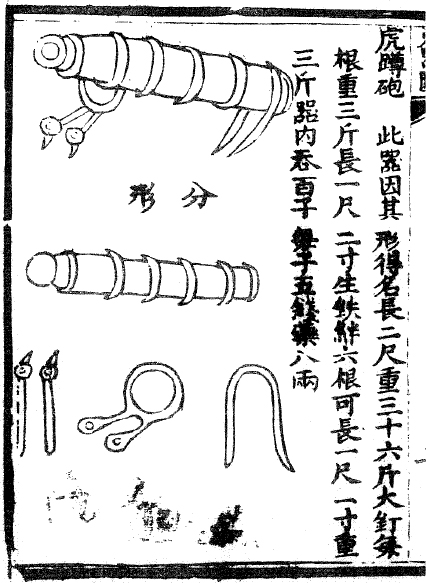
Hu dun pao as a cannon (assembled and disassembled), from Huolongjing (1350)

Hu dun pao (虎蹲砲) is the name of two different missile weapons in Chinese history. In the Song dynasty (960–1279), it was a trebuchet and its name is translated into English as Crouching Tiger Trebuchet; in the Ming dynasty (1368–1644), the name was given to a type of bombard and it is known in English as Crouching Tiger Cannon.

== Trebuchet ==
According to the Song dynasty military compendium Wujing Zongyao (published 1044), the hu dun pao is depicted as a traction trebuchet with a triangular frame. It is operated by a dedicated corps of 70 haulers, who took turns pulling the ropes attached to the trebuchet arm to send the projectile, a 16-pound (7.3 kg) stone or bomb, into flight. It has a range of 85 yards (78 m).

The Annales ianuenses, the official history of Genoa, carries drawings of trabuchium, a counterweighted trebuchet with triangular supporting trusses, that Sinologist Joseph Needham considers to be derived from or related to the Chinese "Crouching Tiger Trebuchet". Similar triangular-framed trebuchets are found in Byzantine sources as labdarea (lambda-shaped machines) and as "Turkish trebuchets" (manjanīq turkī) by Mardi ibn Ali al-Tarsusi and the Templar of Tyre.

Mao Yuanyi (茅元儀; 1594–1640), the compiler of the Ming dynasty military treatise Wubei Zhi, considered the "Crouching Tiger Trebuchet" as an ancestor to the cannon along with other bomb-throwing trebuchets.

== Cannon ==
By the publication of the 1350 edition Huolongjing during the Ming dynasty, the meaning of the character pao 砲 changed from "trebuchet" to "cannon", mirroring the development of gunpowder artillery in China. Likewise, "hu dun pao" came to refer to an early Chinese iron cannon in the same text. The Hulongjing describes the "Crouching Tiger Cannon" as thus:

It measures 2 feet in length and weighs 36 catties (21.6 kg). Each of the (iron) staples (used to pin down the cannon in position) weighs 3 catties and measures 1 ft 2 in. in length. The six cast-iron bands (for strengthening the barrel) each measure 1 ft 1 in. and weigh 3 catties. The barrel holds 100 bullets, each weighing 0.5 oz., and 3 oz. of (gun-)powder.

According to this description and the illustration in the Huolongjing, the "Crouching Tiger Cannon" was a small cannon that was propped up at the muzzle end and pinned to the ground to deaden the recoil. This setup supposedly resembles a crouching tiger, giving the cannon its name like its trebuchet predecessor. The barrel holding 100 bullets could mean the "Crouching Tiger Cannon" fired pellets, or that the bullets could have been placed in a bag as grapeshot.

Of special note are the iron bands acting as reinforcements around the cannon—they indicated that the "Crouching Tiger Cannon" was a built-up cast-iron gun. The iron bands were shrunk onto the barrel while red hot, and the consistently fitting bands show that the Ming Chinese foundrymen had mastered quenching in mass-production conditions. The grounding pins were cast separately.

According to Qi Jiguang's Treatise on Military Training (練兵實紀, Lianbing Shiji) of 1568, the "Crouching Tiger Cannon" was placed at various points on the Chinese frontier since the beginning of the Ming dynasty. They were still used during the Imjin War of 1592–98, where their deployment was crucial in the retaking of Pyongyang (1593) from the Japanese invaders. Following the Imjin War, a typical Fujianese war junk (福船, fuchuan), the standard ship of the Ming navy, would carry the "Crouching Tiger Cannon" alongside heavy cannons, breech-loading cannons, falconets, and fire lances.
