= Cannon =

Large-caliber gun

A cannon (plural either cannons or cannon) is a large-caliber gun classified as a type of artillery, which usually launches a projectile using explosive chemical propellant. Gunpowder ("black powder") was the primary propellant before the invention of smokeless powder during the late 19th century. Cannons vary in gauge, effective range, mobility, rate of fire, angle of fire and firepower; different forms of cannon combine and balance these attributes in varying degrees, depending on their intended use on the battlefield. A cannon is a type of heavy artillery weapon. The word cannon is derived from several languages, in which the original definition can usually be translated as tube, cane, or reed.

The earliest known depiction of cannons may have appeared in Song dynasty China as early as the 12th century; however, solid archaeological and documentary evidence of cannons do not appear until the 13th century. In 1288, Yuan dynasty troops are recorded to have used hand cannons in combat, and the earliest extant cannon bearing a date of production comes from the same period. By the end of the 14th century, cannons were widespread throughout Eurasia.

Cannons were used primarily as anti-infantry weapons until around 1374, when large cannons were recorded to have breached walls for the first time in Europe. Cannons featured prominently as siege weapons. In 1464 a 16,000 kg (35,000 lb) cannon known as the Great Turkish Bombard was created in the Ottoman Empire. Cannons as field artillery became more important after 1453 when cannons broke down the walls of the Eastern Roman Empire's capital, with the introduction of limber, which greatly improved cannon maneuverability and mobility. European cannons reached their longer, lighter, more accurate, and more efficient "classic form" around 1480. This classic European cannon design stayed relatively consistent in form with minor changes until the 1750s.

In the modern era, the term cannon has fallen into disuse, replaced by guns or artillery, if not a more specific term such as howitzer or mortar, except for automatic weapons called autocannons, usually firing explosive shells of larger caliber than machine-gun bullets.

== Etymology and terminology ==
The word cannon is derived from the Old Italian word cannone, meaning "large tube", which came from the Latin canna, in turn originating from the Greek κάννα (kanna), "reed", and then generalised to mean any hollow tube-like object. The word has been used to refer to a gun since 1326 in Italy and 1418 in England. The plural forms cannons and cannon are both correct.

== Early history ==
=== East Asia ===
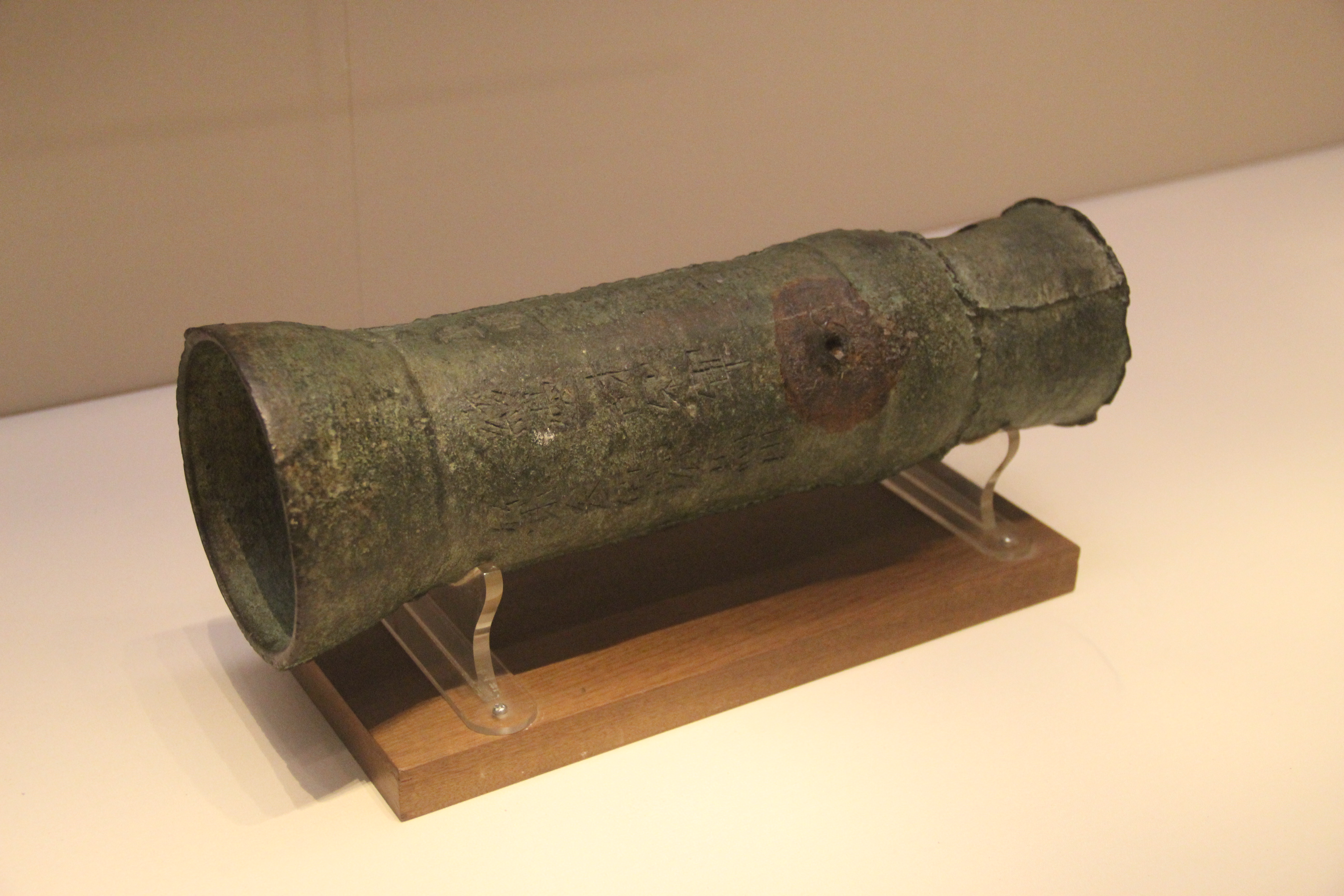
Bronze cannon with inscription dated the 3rd year of the Zhiyuan era (1332) of the Yuan dynasty (1271–1368); it was discovered at the Yunju Temple of Fangshan District, Beijing in 1935.

The cannon may have appeared as early as the 12th century in China, and was probably a parallel development or evolution of the fire-lance, a short ranged anti-personnel weapon combining a gunpowder-filled tube and a polearm. Projectiles such as iron scraps or porcelain shards, mixed together with the gunpowder ("co-viative"), were placed in fire lance barrels at some point, and eventually, the paper and bamboo materials of fire lance barrels were replaced by metal.

The earliest known depiction of a cannon is a sculpture from the Dazu Rock Carvings in Sichuan dated to 1128, however, the earliest archaeological samples and textual accounts do not appear until the 13th century. The primary extant specimens of cannon from the 13th century are the Wuwei Bronze Cannon dated to 1227, the Heilongjiang hand cannon dated to 1288, and the Xanadu Gun dated to 1298. However, only the Xanadu gun contains an inscription bearing a date of production, so it is considered the earliest confirmed extant cannon. The Xanadu Gun is 34.7 cm (13.7 in) in length and weighs 6.2 kg (14 lb). The other cannons are dated using contextual evidence. The Heilongjiang hand cannon is also often considered by some to be the oldest firearm since it was unearthed near the area where the History of Yuan reports a battle took place involving hand cannons. According to the History of Yuan, in 1288, a Jurchen commander by the name of Li Ting led troops armed with hand cannons into battle against the rebel prince Nayan.

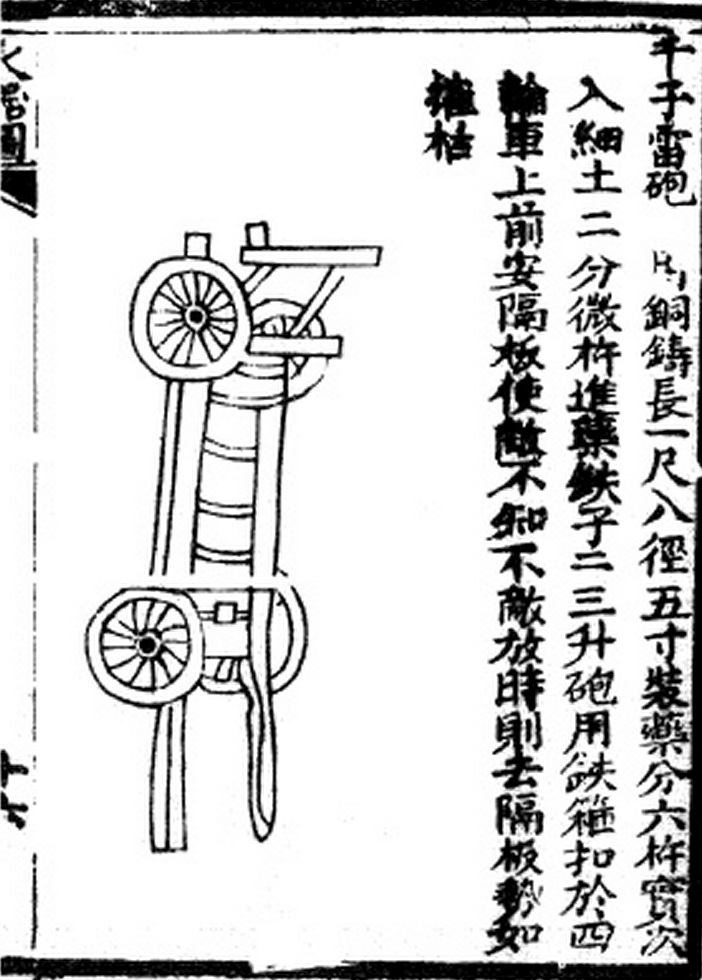
A bronze "thousand ball thunder cannon" from the Huolongjing.

Chen Bingying argues there were no guns before 1259, while Dang Shoushan believes the Wuwei gun and other Western Xia era samples point to the appearance of guns by 1220, and Stephen Haw goes even further by stating that guns were developed as early as 1200. Sinologist Joseph Needham and renaissance siege expert Thomas Arnold provide a more conservative estimate of around 1280 for the appearance of the "true" cannon. Whether or not any of these are correct, it seems likely that the gun was born sometime during the 13th century.

References to cannons proliferated throughout China in the following centuries. Cannon featured in literary pieces. In 1341 Xian Zhang wrote a poem called The Iron Cannon Affair describing a cannonball fired from an eruptor which could "pierce the heart or belly when striking a man or horse, and even transfix several persons at once." By the 1350s the cannon was used extensively in Chinese warfare. In 1358 the Ming army failed to take a city due to its garrisons' usage of cannon, however, they themselves would use cannon, in the thousands, later on during the siege of Suzhou in 1366.

The Mongol invasion of Java in 1293 brought gunpowder technology to the Nusantara archipelago in the form of cannon (Chinese: Pao). During the Ming dynasty cannons were used in riverine warfare at the Battle of Lake Poyang. One shipwreck in Shandong had a cannon dated to 1377 and an anchor dated to 1372. From the 13th to 15th centuries cannon-armed Chinese ships also travelled throughout Southeast Asia. Cannon appeared in Đại Việt by 1390 at the latest.

The first of the western cannon to be introduced were breech-loaders in the early 16th century, which the Chinese began producing themselves by 1523 and improved on by including composite metal construction in their making.

Japan did not acquire cannons until 1510 when a monk brought one back from China, and did not produce any in appreciable numbers. During the 1593 siege of Pyongyang, 40,000 Ming troops deployed a variety of cannons against Japanese troops. Despite their defensive advantage and the use of arquebus by Japanese soldiers, the Japanese were at a severe disadvantage due to their lack of cannon usage. Throughout the Japanese invasions of Korea (1592–1598), the Ming–Joseon coalition used artillery widely in land and naval battles, including on the turtle ships of Yi Sun-sin.

According to Ivan Petlin, the first Russian envoy to Beijing, in September 1619, the city was armed with large cannon with cannonballs weighing more than 30 kg (66 lb).

=== Western Europe ===
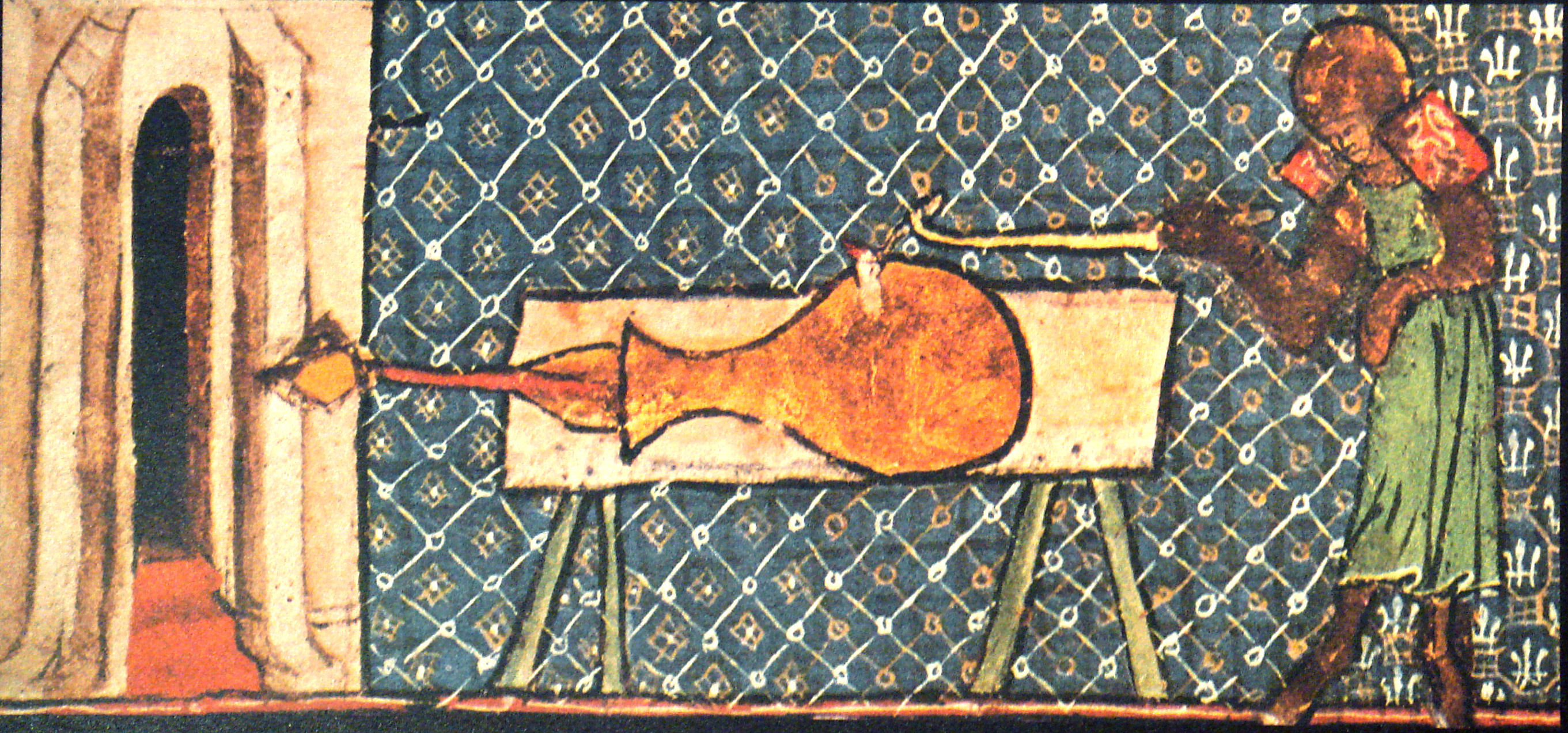
Earliest picture of a European cannon, "De Nobilitatibus Sapientii Et Prudentiis Regum", Walter de Milemete, 1326

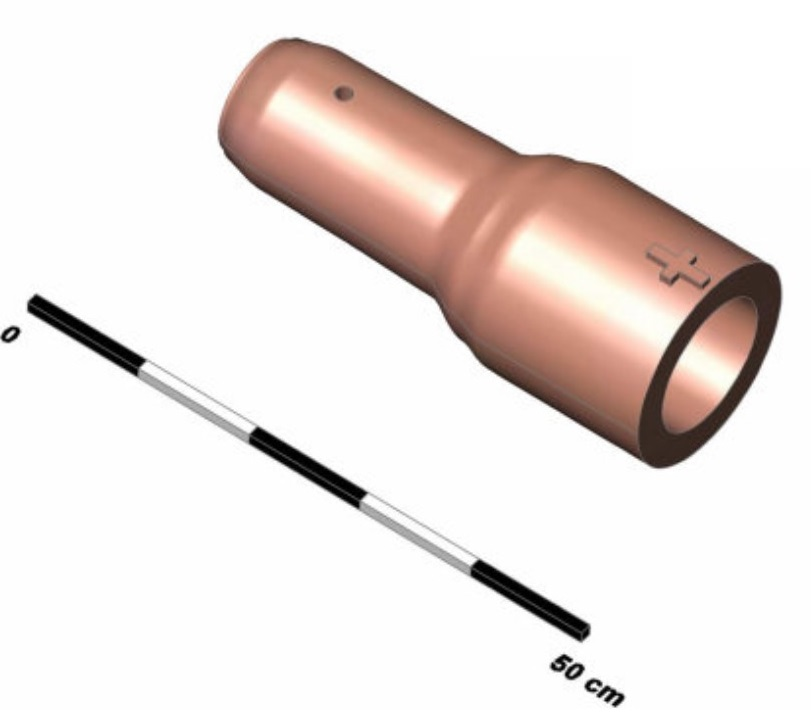
Reconstruction of a copper alloy cannon from Grodno, late 14th century

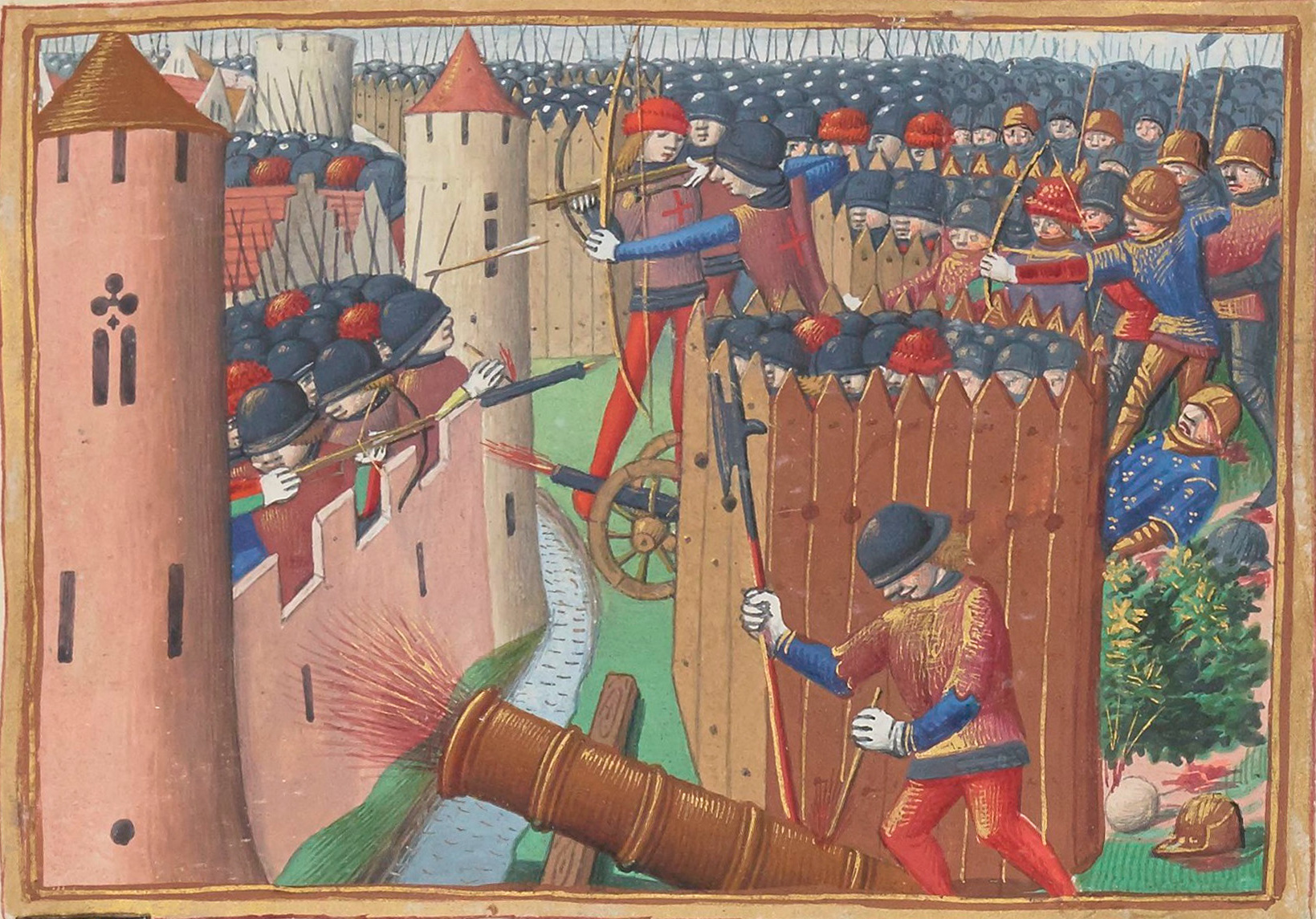
Two cannons featuring in a miniature from 1484 depicting the siege of Orléans in 1429

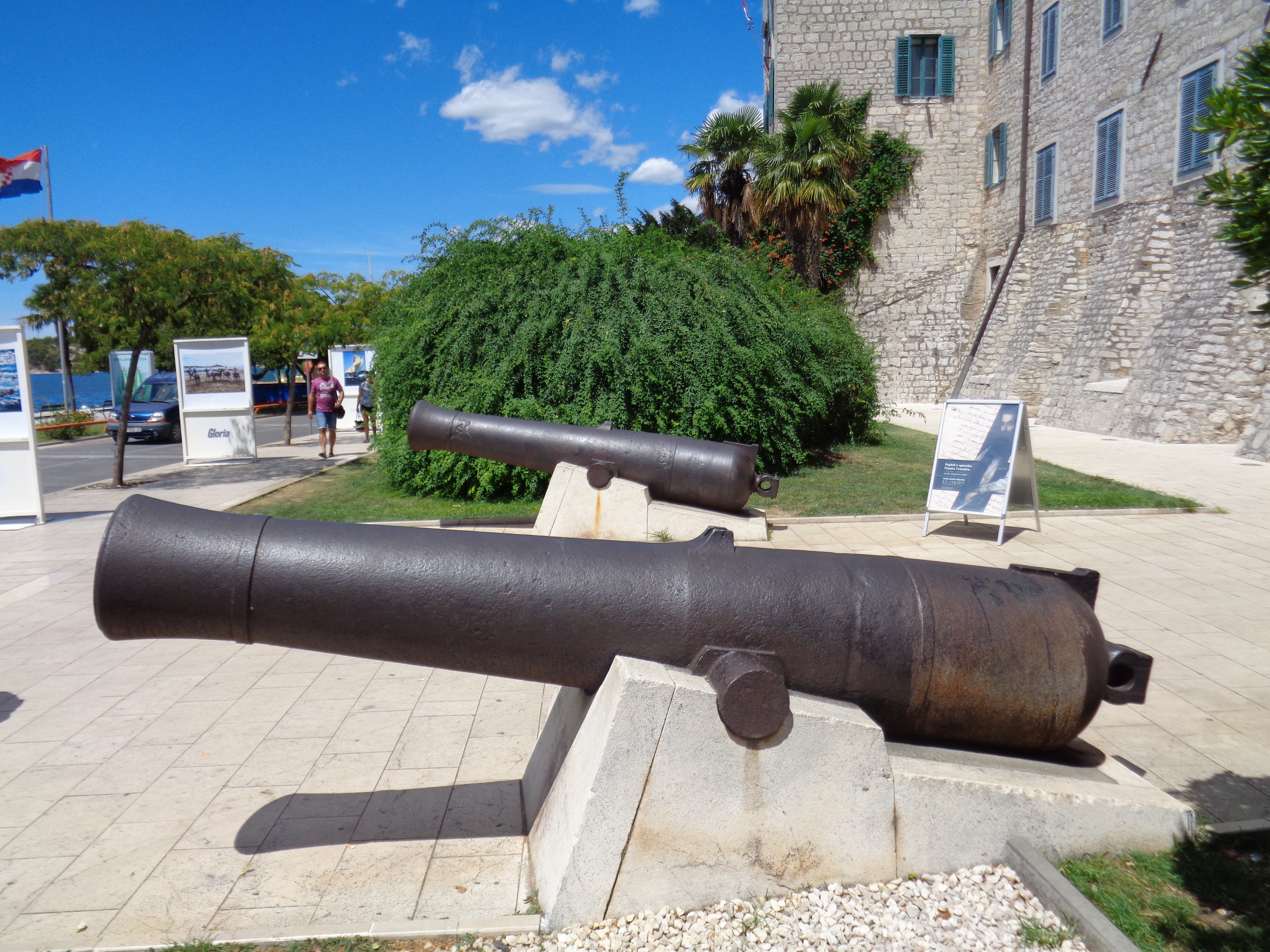
Cannon from the 15th century at Šibenik city walls

Outside of China, the earliest texts to mention gunpowder are Roger Bacon's Opus Majus (1267) and Opus Tertium in what has been interpreted as references to firecrackers. In the early 20th century, a British artillery officer proposed that another work tentatively attributed to Bacon, Epistola de Secretis Operibus Artis et Naturae, et de Nullitate Magiae, dated to 1247, contained an encrypted formula for gunpowder hidden in the text. These claims have been disputed by science historians. In any case, the formula itself is not useful for firearms or even firecrackers, burning slowly and producing mostly smoke.

There is a record of a gun in Europe dating to 1322 that was discovered in the nineteenth century, but the artifact has since been lost. The earliest known European depiction of a gun appeared in 1326 in a manuscript by Walter de Milemete, although not necessarily drawn by him, known as De Nobilitatibus, sapientii et prudentiis regum (Concerning the Majesty, Wisdom, and Prudence of Kings), which displays a gun with a large arrow emerging from it and its user lowering a long stick to ignite the gun through the touch hole. In the same year, another similar illustration showed a darker gun being set off by a group of knights, in another work of de Milemete's, De secretis secretorum Aristotelis. On 11 February of that same year, the Signoria of Florence appointed two officers to obtain canones de mettallo and ammunition for the town's defence. In the following year a document from the Turin area recorded a certain amount was paid "for the making of a certain instrument or device made by Friar Marcello for the projection of pellets of lead". A reference from 1331 describes an attack mounted by two Germanic knights on Cividale del Friuli, using man-portable gunpowder weapons of some sort. The 1320s seem to have been the takeoff point for guns in Europe according to most modern military historians. Scholars suggest that the lack of gunpowder weapons in a well-travelled Venetian's catalogue for a new crusade in 1321 implies that guns were unknown in Europe up until this point, further solidifying the 1320 mark, however more evidence in this area may be forthcoming in the future.

The oldest extant cannon in Europe is a small bronze example unearthed in Loshult, Scania in southern Sweden. It dates from the early-mid 14th century, and is currently in the Swedish History Museum in Stockholm.

Early cannons in Europe often shot arrows and were known by an assortment of names such as pot-de-fer, tonnoire, ribaldis, and büszenpyle. The ribaldis, which shot large arrows and simplistic grapeshot, were first mentioned in the English Privy Wardrobe accounts during preparations for the Battle of Crécy, between 1345 and 1346. The Florentine Giovanni Villani recounts their destructiveness, indicating that by the end of the battle, "the whole plain was covered by men struck down by arrows and cannon balls". Similar cannon were also used at the siege of Calais (1346–47), although it was not until the 1380s that the ribaudekin clearly became mounted on wheels.

The Battle of Crécy which pitted the English against the French in 1346 featured the early use of cannon which helped the longbowmen repulse a large force of Genoese crossbowmen deployed by the French. The English originally intended to use the cannon against cavalry sent to attack their archers, thinking that the loud noises produced by their cannon would panic the advancing horses along with killing the knights atop them.

Early cannons could also be used for more than simply killing men and scaring horses. English cannon were used defensively in 1346 during the siege of Breteuil to launch fire onto an advancing siege tower. In this way, cannons could be used to burn down siege equipment before it reached the fortifications. The use of cannons to shoot fire could also be used offensively as another battle involved the setting of a castle ablaze with similar methods. The particular incendiary used in these projectiles was most likely a gunpowder mixture. This is one area where early Chinese and European cannons share a similarity as both were possibly used to shoot fire.

Early European cannons were rather small, dwarfed by the bombards, which would come later. In fact, it is possible that the cannons used at Crécy were capable of being moved rather quickly as there is an anonymous chronicle that notes the guns being used to attack the French camp, indicating that they would have been mobile enough to press the attack. These smaller cannons would eventually give way to larger, wall-breaching guns by the end of the 1300s.

=== Islamic world ===
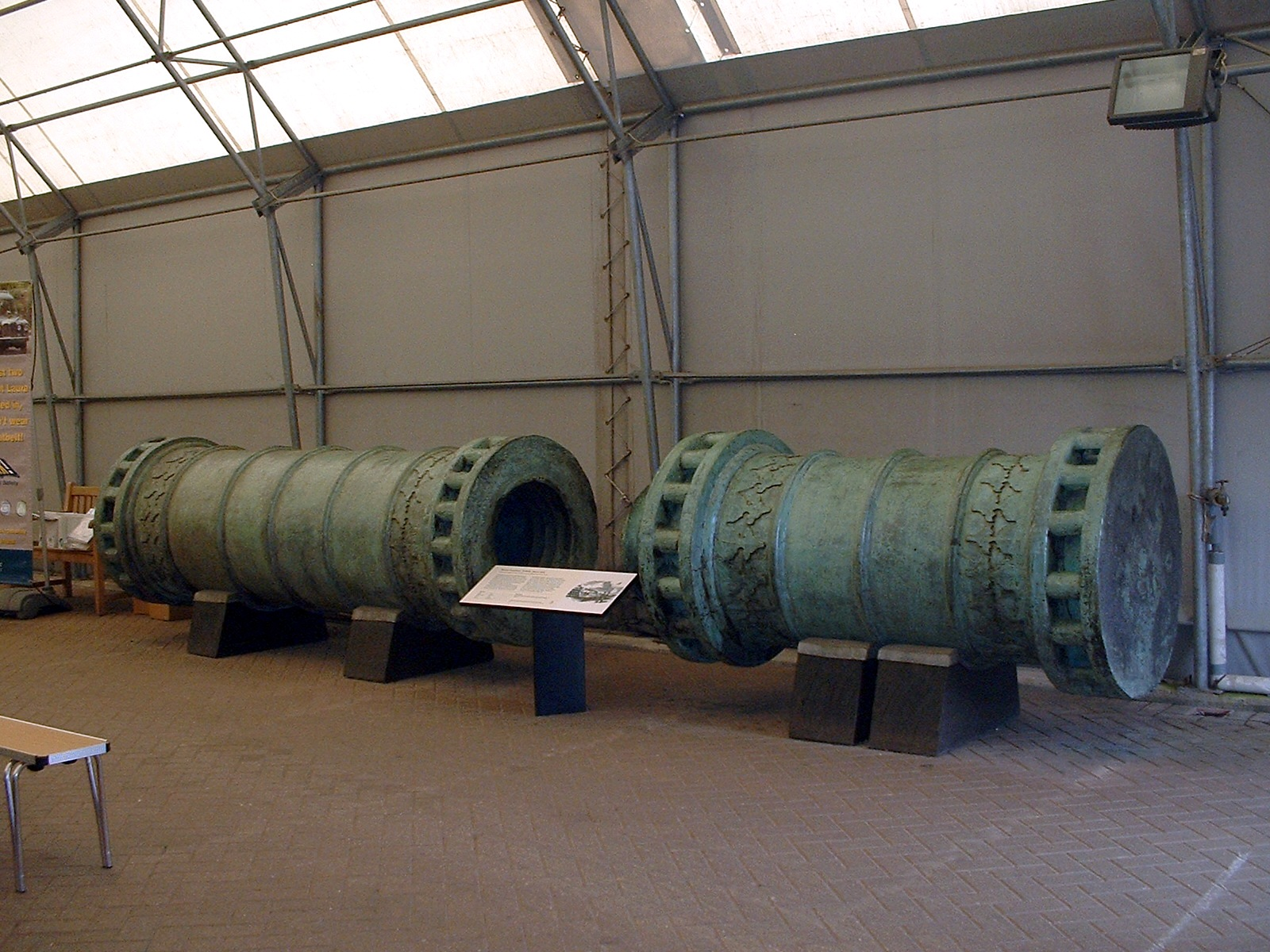
The Dardanelles Gun, a 1464 Ottoman bombard

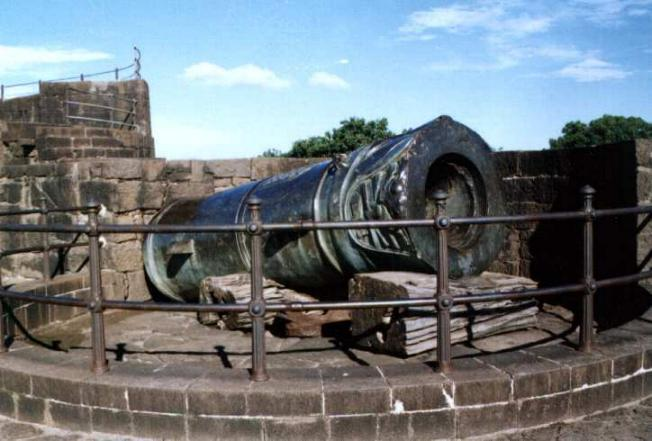
Malik E Maidan, a 16th-century cannon, was effectively used by the Deccan sultanates, and was the largest cannon operated during the Battle of Talikota.

There is no clear consensus on when the cannon first appeared in the Islamic world, with dates ranging from 1260 to the mid-14th century. The cannon may have appeared in the Islamic world in the late 13th century, with Ibn Khaldun in the 14th century stating that cannons were used in the Maghreb region of North Africa in 1274, and other Arabic military treatises in the 14th century referring to the use of cannon by Mamluk forces in 1260 and 1303, and by Muslim forces at the 1324 siege of Huesca in Spain. However, some scholars do not accept these early dates. While the date of its first appearance is not entirely clear, the general consensus among most historians is that there is no doubt the Mamluk forces were using cannon by 1342. Other accounts may have also mentioned the use of cannon in the early 14th century. An Arabic text dating to 1320–1350 describes a type of gunpowder weapon called a midfa which uses gunpowder to shoot projectiles out of a tube at the end of a stock. Some scholars consider this a hand cannon while others dispute this claim. The Nasrid army besieging Elche in 1331 made use of "iron pellets shot with fire".

According to historian Ahmad Y. al-Hassan, during the Battle of Ain Jalut in 1260, the Mamluks used cannon against the Mongols. He claims that this was "the first cannon in history" and used a gunpowder formula almost identical to the ideal composition for explosive gunpowder. He also argues that this was not known in China or Europe until much later. Al-Hassan further claims that the earliest textual evidence of cannon is from the Middle East, based on earlier originals which report hand-held cannons being used by the Mamluks at the Battle of Ain Jalut in 1260. Such an early date is not accepted by some historians, including David Ayalon, Iqtidar Alam Khan, Joseph Needham and Tonio Andrade. Khan argues that it was the Mongols who introduced gunpowder to the Islamic world, and believes cannon only reached Mamluk Egypt in the 1370s. Needham argued that the term midfa, dated to textual sources from 1342 to 1352, did not refer to true hand-guns or bombards, and that contemporary accounts of a metal-barrel cannon in the Islamic world did not occur until 1365. Similarly, Andrade dates the textual appearance of cannons in middle eastern sources to the 1360s. Gabor Ágoston and David Ayalon note that the Mamluks had certainly used siege cannons by 1342 or the 1360s, respectively, but earlier uses of cannons in the Islamic World are vague with a possible appearance in the Emirate of Granada by the 1320s and 1330s, though evidence is inconclusive.

Ibn Khaldun reported the use of cannon as siege machines by the Marinid sultan Abu Yaqub Yusuf at the siege of Sijilmasa in 1274. The passage by Ibn Khaldun on the Marinid siege of Sijilmassa in 1274 occurs as follows: "[The Sultan] installed siege engines ... and gunpowder engines ..., which project small balls of iron. These balls are ejected from a chamber ... placed in front of a kindling fire of gunpowder; this happens by a strange property which attributes all actions to the power of the Creator." The source is not contemporary and was written a century later, around 1382. Its interpretation has been rejected as anachronistic by some historians, who urge caution regarding claims of Islamic firearms use in the 1204–1324 period as late medieval Arabic texts used the same word for gunpowder, naft, as they did for an earlier incendiary, naphtha. Ágoston and Peter Purton note that in the 1204–1324 period, late medieval Arabic texts used the same word for gunpowder, naft, that they used for an earlier incendiary, naphtha. Needham believes Ibn Khaldun was speaking of fire lances rather than hand cannon.

The Ottoman Empire made good use of cannon as siege artillery. Sixty-eight super-sized bombards were used by Mehmed the Conqueror to capture Constantinople in 1453. Jim Bradbury argues that Urban, a Hungarian cannon engineer, introduced this cannon from Central Europe to the Ottoman realm; according to Paul Hammer, however, it could have been introduced from other Islamic countries which had earlier used cannons. These cannons could fire heavy stone balls a mile, and the sound of their blast could reportedly be heard from a distance of 10 miles (16 km). Shkodëran historian Marin Barleti discusses Turkish bombards at length in his book De obsidione Scodrensi (1504), describing the 1478–79 siege of Shkodra in which eleven bombards and two mortars were employed. The Ottomans also used cannon to control passage of ships through the Bosphorus strait. Ottoman cannons also proved effective at stopping crusaders at Varna in 1444 and Kosovo in 1448 despite the presence of European cannon in the former case.

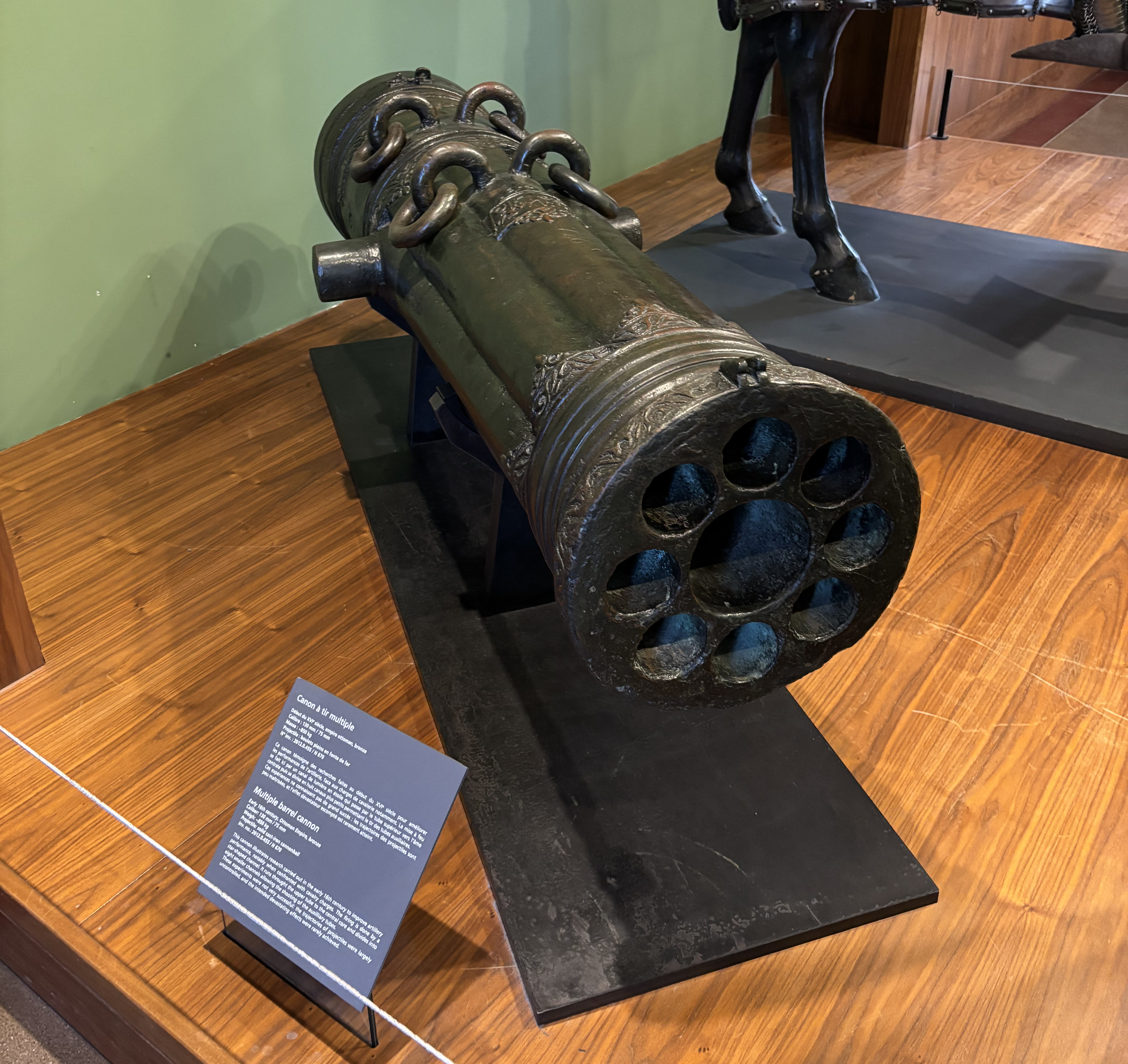
Experimental bronze multi barrel cannon created by the Ottoman Empire in the 16th century, located at Les Invalides

The similar Dardanelles Guns (for the location) were created by Munir Ali in 1464 and were still in use during the Anglo-Turkish War (1807–1809). These were cast in bronze into two parts: the chase (the barrel) and the breech, which combined weighed 18.4 tonnes. The two parts were screwed together using levers to facilitate moving it.

Fathullah Shirazi, a Persian inhabitant of India who worked for Akbar in the Mughal Empire, developed a volley gun in the 16th century.

While there is evidence of cannons in Iran as early as 1405 they were not widespread. This changed following the increased use of firearms by Shah Ismail I, and the Iranian army used 500 cannons by the 1620s, probably captured from the Ottomans or acquired by allies in Europe. By 1443, Iranians were also making some of their own cannon, as Mir Khawand wrote of a 1200 kg metal piece being made by an Iranian rikhtegar which was most likely a cannon. Due to the difficulties of transporting cannon in mountainous terrain, their use was less common compared to their use in Europe.

=== Eastern Europe ===
Documentary evidence of cannons in Russia does not appear until 1382 and they were used only in sieges, often by the defenders. It was not until 1475 when Ivan III established the first Russian cannon foundry in Moscow that they began to produce cannons natively. The earliest surviving cannon from Russia dates to 1485.

Later on, large cannons were known as bombards, ranging from three to five feet in length and were used by Dubrovnik and Kotor in defence during the later 14th century. The first bombards were made of iron, but bronze became more prevalent as it was recognized as more stable and capable of propelling stones weighing as much as 45 kilograms (99 lb). Around the same period, the Byzantine Empire began to accumulate its own cannon to face the Ottoman Empire, starting with medium-sized cannon 3 feet (0.91 m) long and of 10 in calibre. The earliest reliable recorded use of artillery in the region was against the Ottoman siege of Constantinople in 1396, forcing the Ottomans to withdraw. The Ottomans acquired their own cannon and laid siege to the Byzantine capital again in 1422. By 1453, the Ottomans used 68 Hungarian-made cannon for the 55-day bombardment of the walls of Constantinople, "hurling the pieces everywhere and killing those who happened to be nearby". The largest of their cannons was the Great Turkish Bombard, which required an operating crew of 200 men and 70 oxen, and 10,000 men to transport it. Gunpowder made the formerly devastating Greek fire obsolete, and with the final fall of Constantinople—which was protected by what were once the strongest walls in Europe—on 29 May 1453, "it was the end of an era in more ways than one".

=== Southeast Asia ===
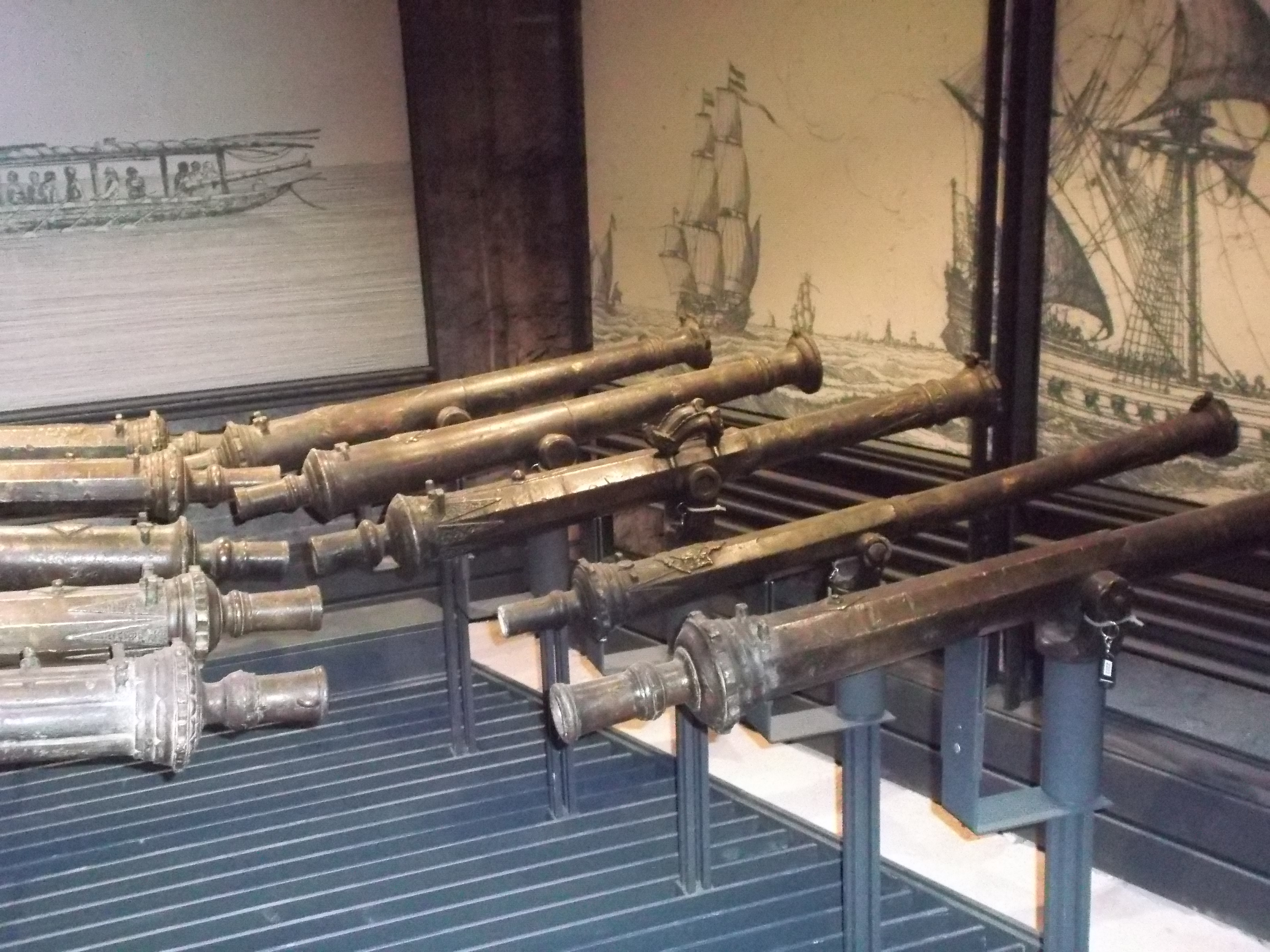
Collection of Philippine lantaka in a European museum

Cannons were introduced to the Javanese Majapahit Empire when Kublai Khan's Mongol-Chinese army under the leadership of Ike Mese sought to invade Java in 1293. History of Yuan mentioned that the Mongol used a weapon called p'ao against Daha forces. This weapon is interpreted differently by researchers, it may be a trebuchet that throws thunderclap bombs, firearms, cannons, or rockets. It is possible that the gunpowder weapons carried by the Mongol–Chinese troops amounted to more than one type.

Thomas Stamford Raffles wrote in The History of Java that in 1247 saka (1325 AD), cannons were widely used in Java especially by the Majapahit. It is recorded that the small kingdoms in Java that sought the protection of Majapahit had to hand over their cannons to the Majapahit. Majapahit under Mahapatih (prime minister) Gajah Mada (in office 1331–1364) utilized gunpowder technology obtained from Yuan dynasty for use in naval fleet.

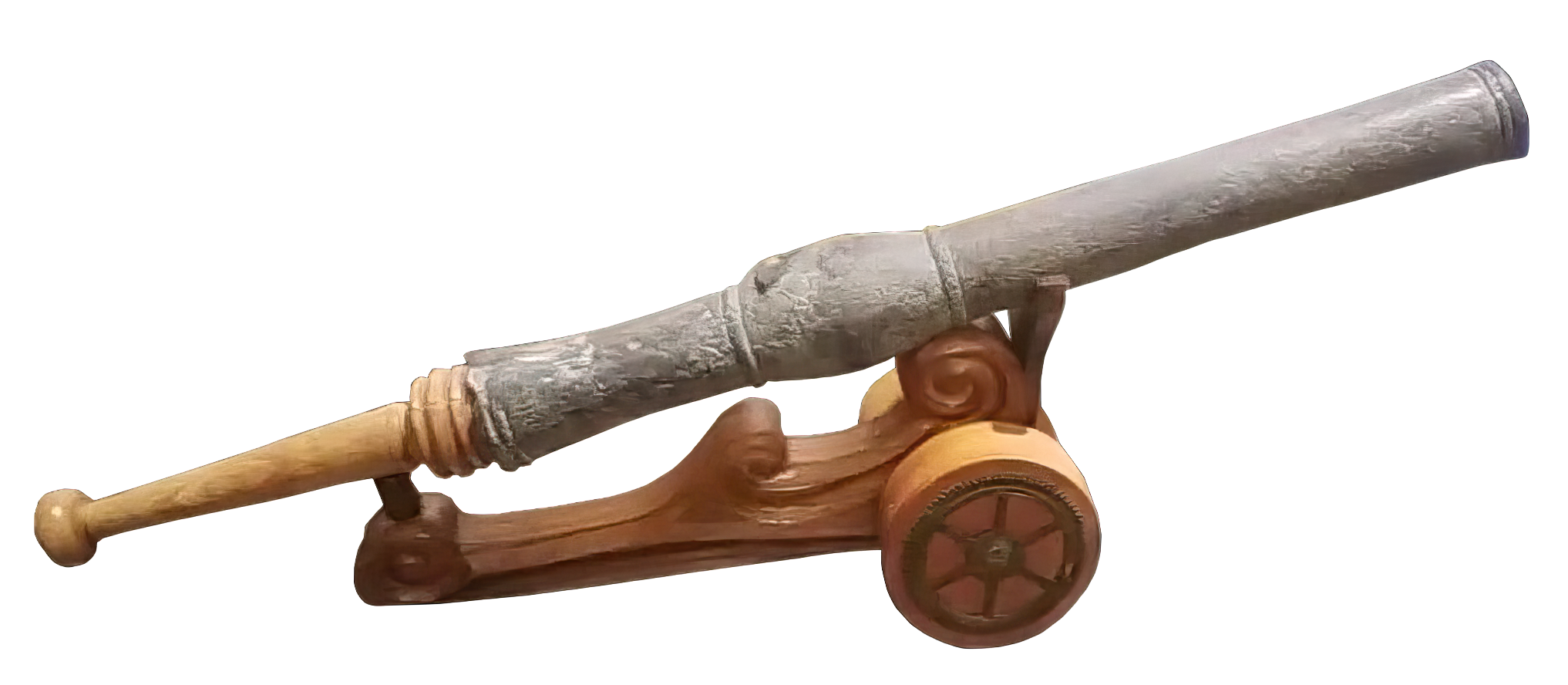
A cannon found from the Brantas river. Made of bronze, with a triangular embossed touch hole. The wooden parts were recently made for display.

Mongol-Chinese gunpowder technology of Yuan dynasty resulted in eastern-style cetbang which is similar to Chinese cannon. Swivel guns however, only developed in the archipelago because of the close maritime relations of the Nusantara archipelago with the territory of West India after 1460 AD, which brought new types of gunpowder weapons to the archipelago, likely through Arab intermediaries. This weapon seems to be cannon and gun of Ottoman tradition, for example the prangi, which is a breech-loading swivel gun. A new type of cetbang, called the western-style cetbang, was derived from the Turkish prangi. Just like prangi, this cetbang is a breech-loading swivel gun made of bronze or iron, firing single rounds or scattershots (a large number of small bullets).

Cannons derived from western-style cetbang can be found in Nusantara, among others were lantaka and lela. Most lantakas were made of bronze and the earliest ones were breech-loaded. There is a trend toward muzzle-loading weapons during colonial times. When the Portuguese came to the archipelago, they referred to the breech-loading swivel gun as berço, while the Spaniards call it verso. A pole gun (bedil tombak) was recorded as being used by Java in 1413.

Duarte Barbosa c. 1514 said that the inhabitants of Java were great masters in casting artillery and very good artillerymen. They made many one-pounder cannon (cetbang or rentaka), long muskets, spingarde (arquebus), schioppi (hand cannon), Greek fire, guns (cannon), and other fireworks. Every place was considered excellent in casting artillery, and in the knowledge of using it. In 1513, the Javanese fleet led by Pati Unus sailed to attack Portuguese Malacca "with much artillery made in Java, for the Javanese are skilled in founding and casting, and in all works in iron, over and above what they have in India". By early 16th century, the Javanese already locally-producing large guns, some of them still survived until the present day and dubbed as "sacred cannon" or "holy cannon". These cannons varied between 180- and 260-pounders, weighing anywhere between 3 and 8 tons, length of them between 3 and 6 m (9.8 and 19.7 ft).

Cannons were used by the Ayutthaya Kingdom in 1352 during its invasion of the Khmer Empire. Within a decade large quantities of gunpowder could be found in the Khmer Empire. By the end of the 14th century firearms were also used by the Trần dynasty.

Saltpeter harvesting was recorded by Dutch and German travellers as being common in even the smallest villages and was collected from the decomposition process of large dung hills specifically piled for the purpose. The Dutch punishment for possession of non-permitted gunpowder appears to have been amputation. Ownership and manufacture of gunpowder was later prohibited by the colonial Dutch occupiers. According to colonel McKenzie quoted in Sir Thomas Stamford Raffles' The History of Java (1817), the purest sulfur was supplied from a crater from a mountain near the straits of Bali.

=== Africa ===
In Africa, the Adal Sultanate and the Abyssinian Empire both deployed cannons during the Adal-Abyssinian War. Imported from Arabia, and the wider Islamic world, the Adalites led by Ahmed ibn Ibrahim al-Ghazi were the first African power to introduce cannon warfare to the African continent. Later on as the Portuguese Empire entered the war it would supply and train the Abyssinians with cannons, while the Ottoman Empire sent soldiers and cannon to back Adal. The conflict proved, through their use on both sides, the value of firearms such as the matchlock musket, cannon, and the arquebus over traditional weapons.

=== Offensive and defensive use ===
While previous smaller guns could burn down structures with fire, larger and more powerful cannons forced engineers to develop stronger castle walls from enemy attacks. Cannons were used for other purposes, as fortifications began using cannons as defensive instruments. In India, the fort of Raicher had gun ports built into its walls to accommodate the use of defensive cannons. In The Art of War, Niccolò Machiavelli opined that field artillery forced an army to take up a defensive posture and opposed a more ideal offensive stance. Machiavelli's concerns can be seen in the criticisms of Portuguese mortars being used in India during the sixteenth century as lack of mobility was one of the key problems with the design. In Russia the early cannons were again placed in forts as a defensive tool. Cannons were also difficult to move around in mountainous regions; offensives conducted with such weapons would often be unsuccessful in areas such as Iran.

== Modern history ==
=== Early modern ===
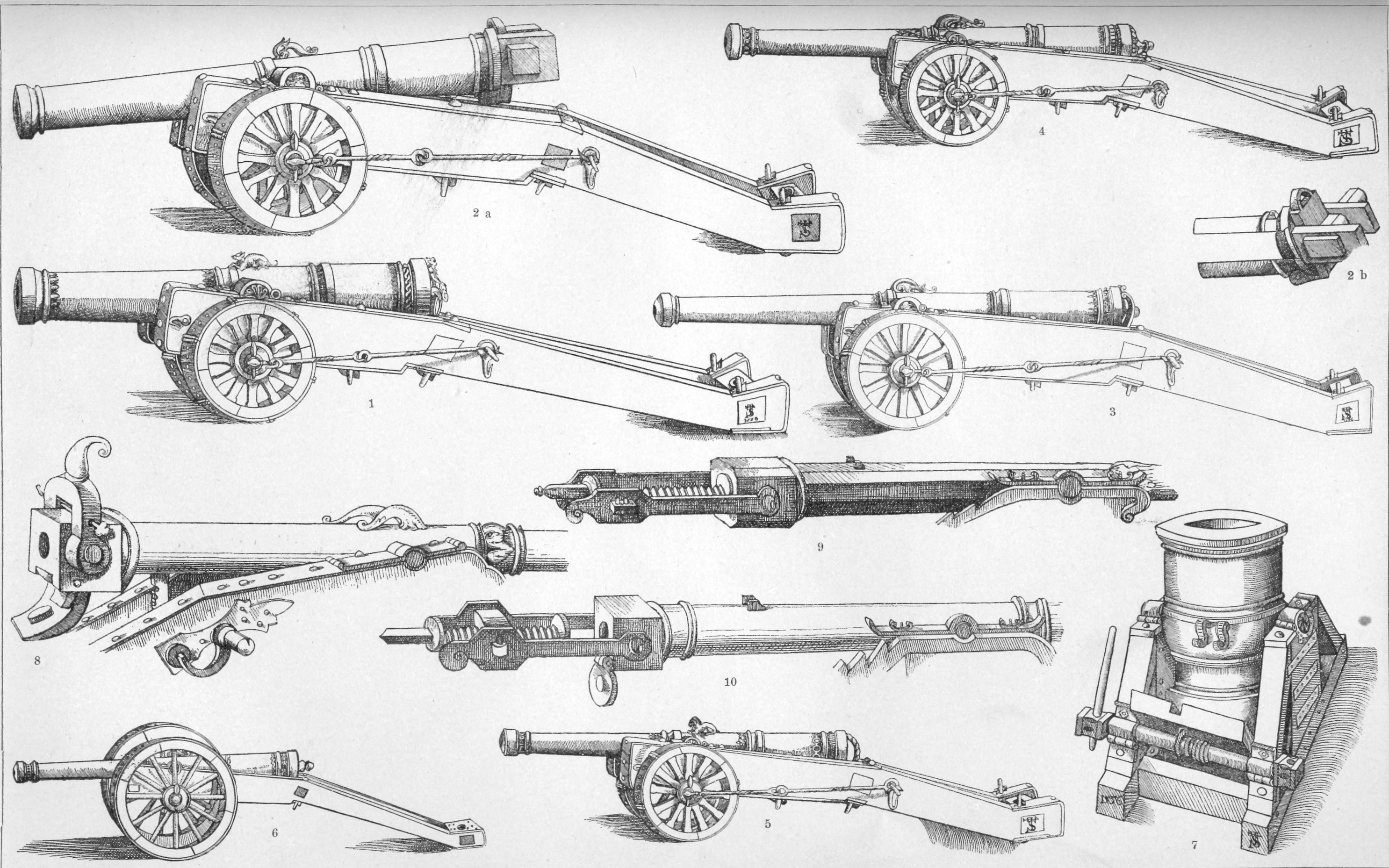
Various 16th-century artillery pieces, including culverin, falconet and mortar

By the 16th century, cannons were made in a great variety of lengths and bore diameters, but the general rule was that the longer the barrel, the longer the range. Some cannons made during this time had barrels exceeding 10 ft (3.0 m) in length, and could weigh up to 20,000 pounds (9,100 kg). Consequently, large amounts of gunpowder were needed to allow them to fire stone balls several hundred yards. By mid-century, European monarchs began to classify cannons to reduce the confusion. Henry II of France opted for six sizes of cannon, but others settled for more; the Spanish used twelve sizes, and the English sixteen. They are, from largest to smallest: the cannon royal, cannon, cannon serpentine, bastard cannon, demicannon, pedrero, culverin, basilisk, demiculverin, bastard culverin, saker, minion, falcon, falconet, serpentine, and rabinet. Better powder had been developed by this time as well. Instead of the finely ground powder used by the first bombards, powder was replaced by a "corned" variety of coarse grains. This coarse powder had pockets of air between grains, allowing fire to travel through and ignite the entire charge quickly and uniformly.

The end of the Middle Ages saw the construction of larger, more powerful cannon, as well as their spread throughout the world. As they were not effective at breaching the newer fortifications resulting from the development of cannon, siege engines—such as siege towers and trebuchets—became less widely used. However, wooden "battery-towers" took on a similar role as siege towers in the gunpowder age—such as that used at Siege of Kazan in 1552, which could hold ten large-calibre cannon, in addition to 50 lighter pieces. Another notable effect of cannon on warfare during this period was the change in conventional fortifications. Niccolò Machiavelli wrote, "There is no wall, whatever its thickness that artillery will not destroy in only a few days." Although castles were not immediately made obsolete by cannon, their use and importance on the battlefield rapidly declined. Instead of majestic towers and merlons, the walls of new fortresses were thick, angled, and sloped, while towers became low and stout; increasing use was also made of earth and brick in breastworks and redoubts. These new defences became known as bastion forts, after their characteristic shape which attempted to force any advance towards it directly into the firing line of the guns. A few of these featured cannon batteries, such as the House of Tudor's Device Forts in England. Bastion forts soon replaced castles in Europe and, eventually, those in the Americas as well.

By the end of the 15th century, several technological advancements made cannons more mobile. Wheeled gun carriages and trunnions became common, and the invention of the limber further facilitated transportation. As a result, field artillery became more viable and began to see more widespread use, often alongside the larger cannons intended for sieges. Better gunpowder, cast-iron projectiles (replacing stone), and the standardisation of calibres meant that even relatively light cannons could be deadly. In The Art of War, Niccolò Machiavelli observed that "It is true that the arquebuses and the small artillery do much more harm than the heavy artillery." This was the case at the Battle of Flodden, in 1513: the English field guns outfired the Scottish siege artillery, firing two or three times as many rounds. Despite the increased maneuverability, however, cannon were still the slowest component of the army: a heavy English cannon required 23 horses to transport, while a culverin needed nine. Even with this many animals pulling, they still moved at a walking pace. Due to their relatively slow speed, lack of organisation, and undeveloped tactics, the combination of pike and shot still dominated the battlefields of Europe.

Innovations continued, notably the German invention of the mortar, a thick-walled, short-barrelled gun that blasted shot upward at a steep angle. Mortars were useful for sieges, as they could hit targets behind walls or other defences. This cannon found more use with the Dutch, who learnt to shoot bombs filled with powder from them. Setting the bomb fuse was a problem. "Single firing" was first used to ignite the fuse, where the bomb was placed with the fuse down against the cannon's propellant. This often resulted in the fuse being blown into the bomb, causing it to blow up as it left the mortar. Because of this, "double firing" was tried where the gunner lit the fuse and then the touch hole. This required considerable skill and timing, and was especially dangerous if the gun misfired, leaving a lighted bomb in the barrel. Not until 1650 was it accidentally discovered that double-lighting was superfluous as the heat of firing would light the fuse.

Gustavus Adolphus of Sweden emphasised the use of light cannon and mobility in his army, and created new formations and tactics that revolutionised artillery. He discontinued using all 12 pounder—or heavier—cannon as field artillery, preferring, instead, to use cannons that could be handled by only a few men. One obsolete type of gun, the "leatheren", was replaced by 4 pounder and 9 pounder demi-culverins. These could be operated by three men, and pulled by only two horses. Gustavus Adolphus's army was also the first to use a cartridge that contained both powder and shot which sped up reloading, increasing the rate of fire. Finally, against infantry he pioneered the use of canister shot—essentially a tin can filled with musket balls. Until then there was no more than one cannon for every thousand infantrymen on the battlefield but Gustavus Adolphus increased the number of cannons sixfold. Each regiment was assigned two pieces, though he often arranged them into batteries instead of distributing them piecemeal. He used these batteries to break his opponent's infantry line, while his cavalry would outflank their heavy guns.

At the Battle of Breitenfeld, in 1631, Adolphus proved the effectiveness of the changes made to his army, by defeating Johann Tserclaes, Count of Tilly. Although severely outnumbered, the Swedes were able to fire between three and five times as many volleys of artillery, and their infantry's linear formations helped ensure they did not lose any ground. Battered by cannon fire, and low on morale, Tilly's men broke ranks and fled.

In England, cannons were being used to besiege various fortified buildings during the English Civil War. Nathaniel Nye is recorded as testing a Birmingham cannon in 1643 and experimenting with a saker in 1645. From 1645 he was the master gunner to the Parliamentarian garrison at Evesham and in 1646 he successfully directed the artillery at the Siege of Worcester, detailing his experiences and in his 1647 book The Art of Gunnery. Believing that war was as much a science as an art, his explanations focused on triangulation, arithmetic, theoretical mathematics, and cartography as well as practical considerations such as the ideal specification for gunpowder or slow matches. His book acknowledged mathematicians such as Robert Recorde and Marcus Jordanus as well as earlier military writers on artillery such as Niccolò Fontana Tartaglia and Thomas (or Francis) Malthus (author of A Treatise on Artificial Fire-Works).

Around this time also came the idea of aiming the cannon to hit a target. Gunners controlled the range of their cannons by measuring the angle of elevation, using a "gunner's quadrant". Cannons did not have sights; therefore, even with measuring tools, aiming was still largely guesswork.

In the latter half of the 17th century, the French engineer Sébastien Le Prestre de Vauban introduced a more systematic and scientific approach to attacking gunpowder fortresses, in a time when many field commanders "were notorious dunces in siegecraft". Careful sapping forward, supported by enfilading ricochets, was a key feature of this system, and it even allowed Vauban to calculate the length of time a siege would take. He was also a prolific builder of bastion forts, and did much to popularize the idea of "depth in defence" in the face of cannon. These principles were followed into the mid-19th century, when changes in armaments necessitated greater depth defence than Vauban had provided for. It was only in the years prior to World War I that new works began to break radically away from his designs.

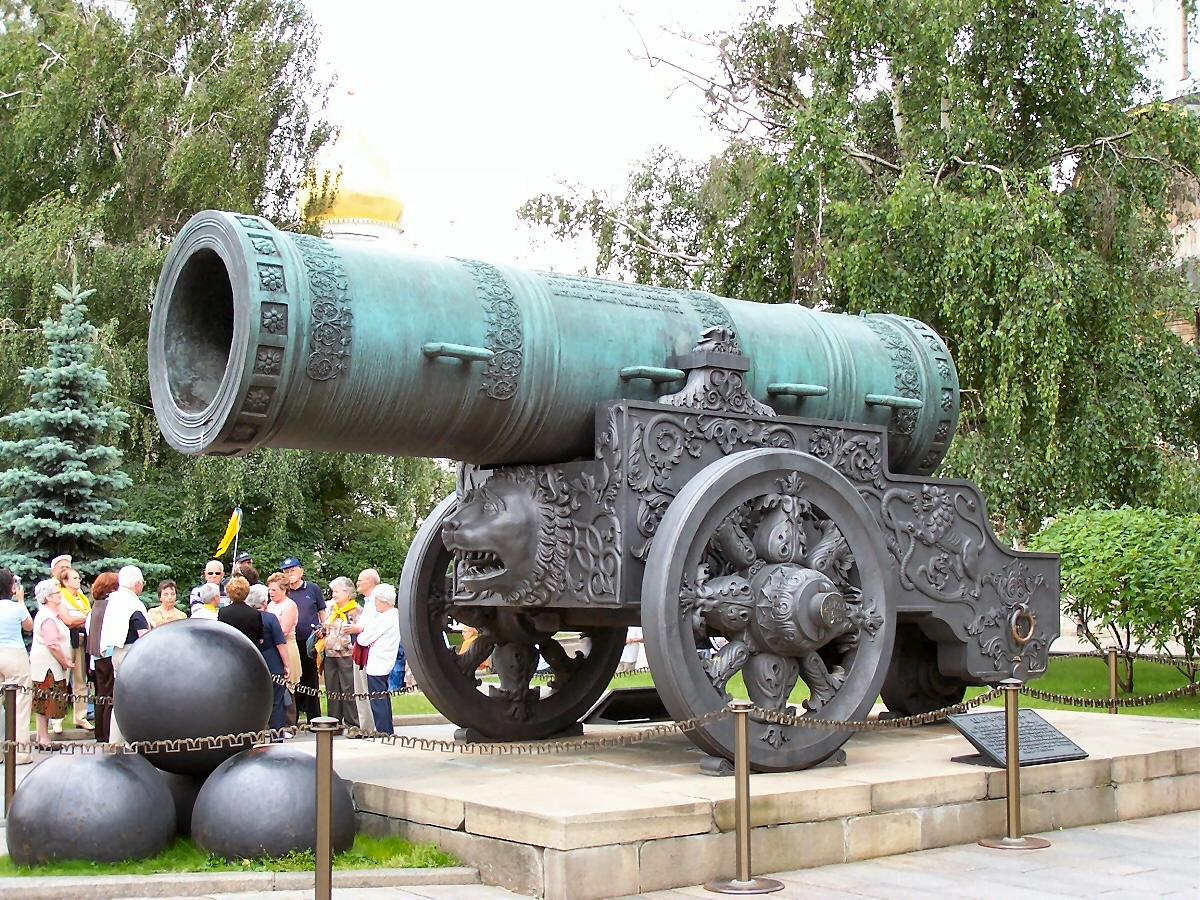
The Tsar Cannon, the largest howitzer ever made, cast by Andrey Chokhov

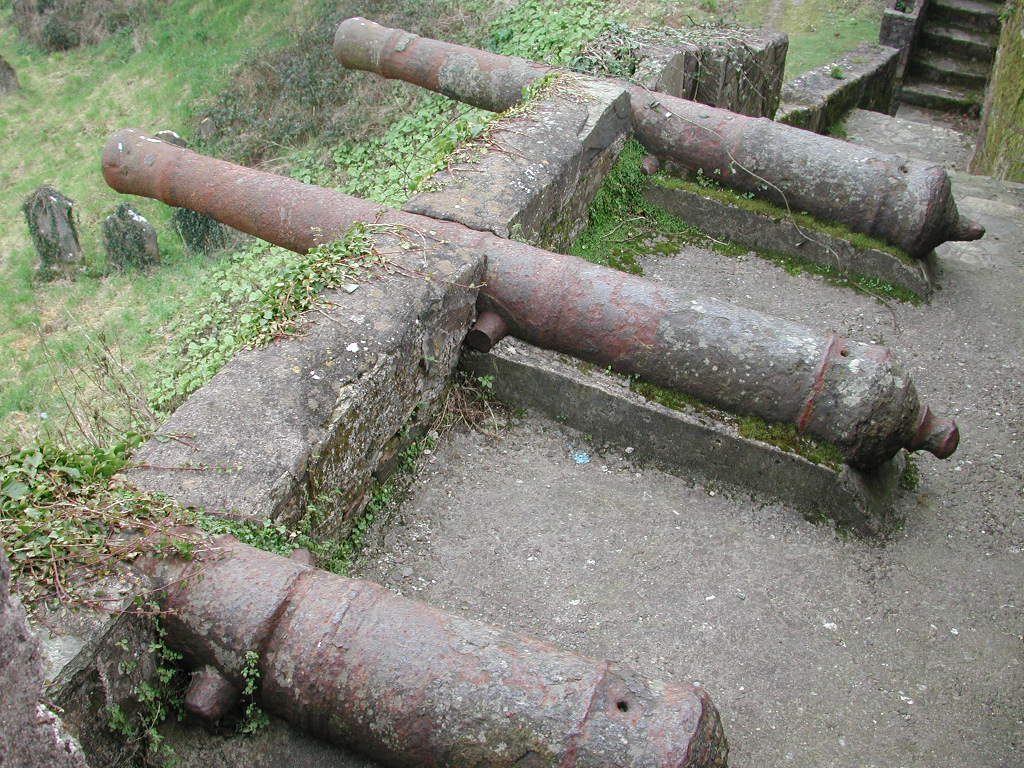
Remains of a post-medieval cannon battery, mounted on a medieval town wall, although without carriages.

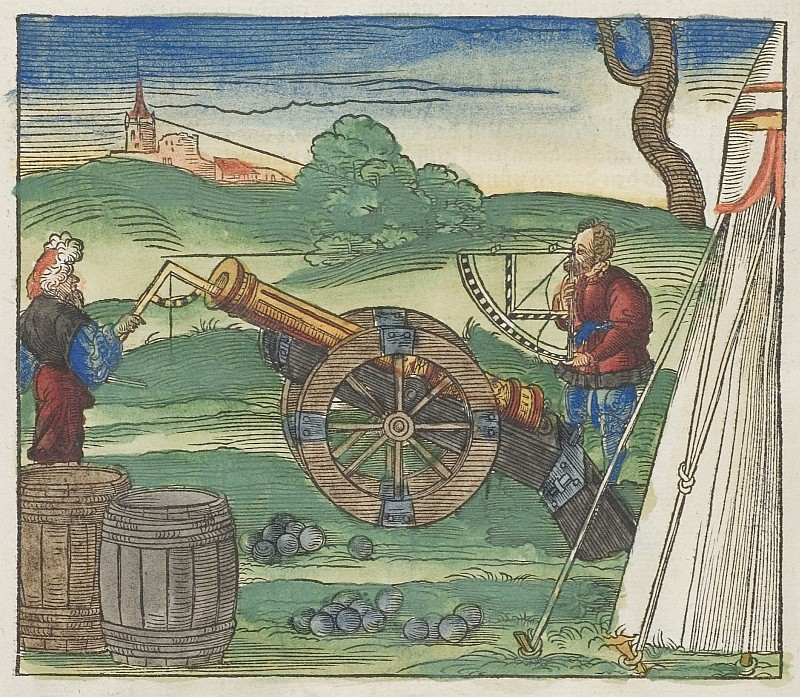
Contemporary illustration on how a cannon could be used with the aid of quadrants for improved precision.

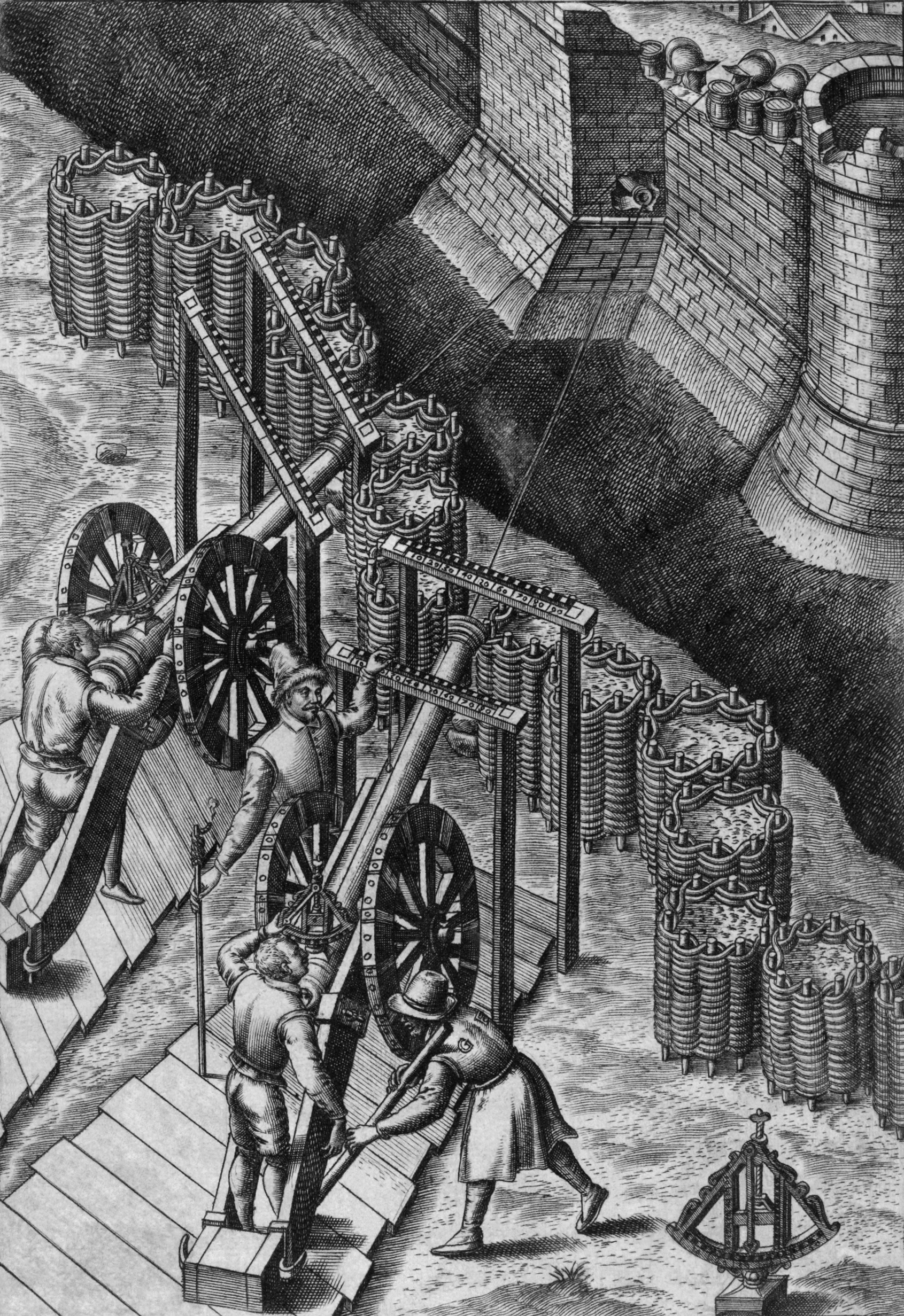
The use of gabions with cannon was an important part in the attack and defence of fortifications.

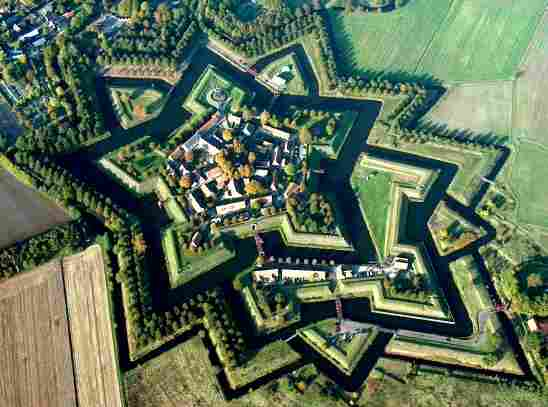
Fort Bourtange, a bastion fort, was built with angles and sloped walls specifically to defend against cannon.

=== 18th and 19th centuries ===
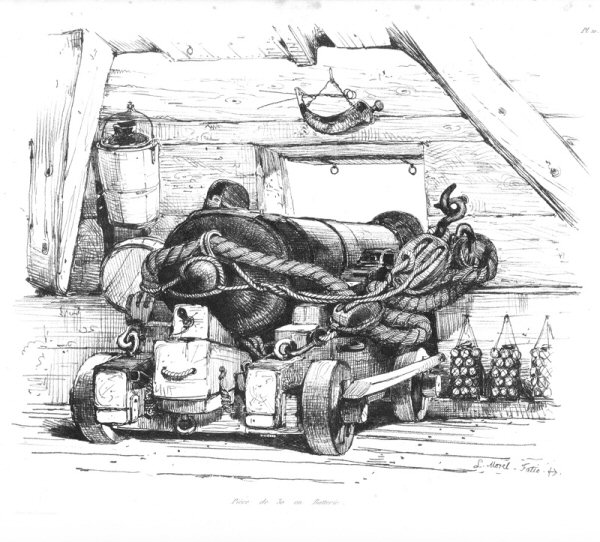
36-pounder long gun at the ready

The lower tier of 17th-century English ships of the line were usually equipped with demi-cannons, guns that fired a 32-pound (15 kg) solid shot, and could weigh up to 3,400 pounds (1,500 kg). Demi-cannons were capable of firing these heavy metal balls with such force that they could penetrate more than a metre of solid oak, from a distance of 90 m (300 ft), and could dismast even the largest ships at close range. Full cannon fired a 42-pound (19 kg) shot, but were discontinued by the 18th century, as they were too unwieldy. By the end of the 18th century, principles long adopted in Europe specified the characteristics of the Royal Navy's cannon, as well as the acceptable defects, and their severity. The United States Navy tested guns by measuring them, firing them two or three times—termed "proof by powder"—and using pressurized water to detect leaks.

The carronade was adopted by the Royal Navy in 1779; the lower muzzle velocity of the round shot when fired from this cannon was intended to create more wooden splinters when hitting the structure of an enemy vessel, as they were believed to be more deadly than the ball by itself. The carronade was much shorter, and weighed between a third to a quarter of the equivalent long gun; for example, a 32-pounder carronade weighed less than a ton, compared with a 32-pounder long gun, which weighed over 3 t (3.0 long tons; 3.3 short tons). The guns were, therefore, easier to handle, and also required less than half as much gunpowder, allowing fewer men to crew them. Carronades were manufactured in the usual naval gun calibres, but were not counted in a ship of the line's rated number of guns. As a result, the classification of Royal Navy vessels in this period can be misleading, as they often carried more cannons than were listed.

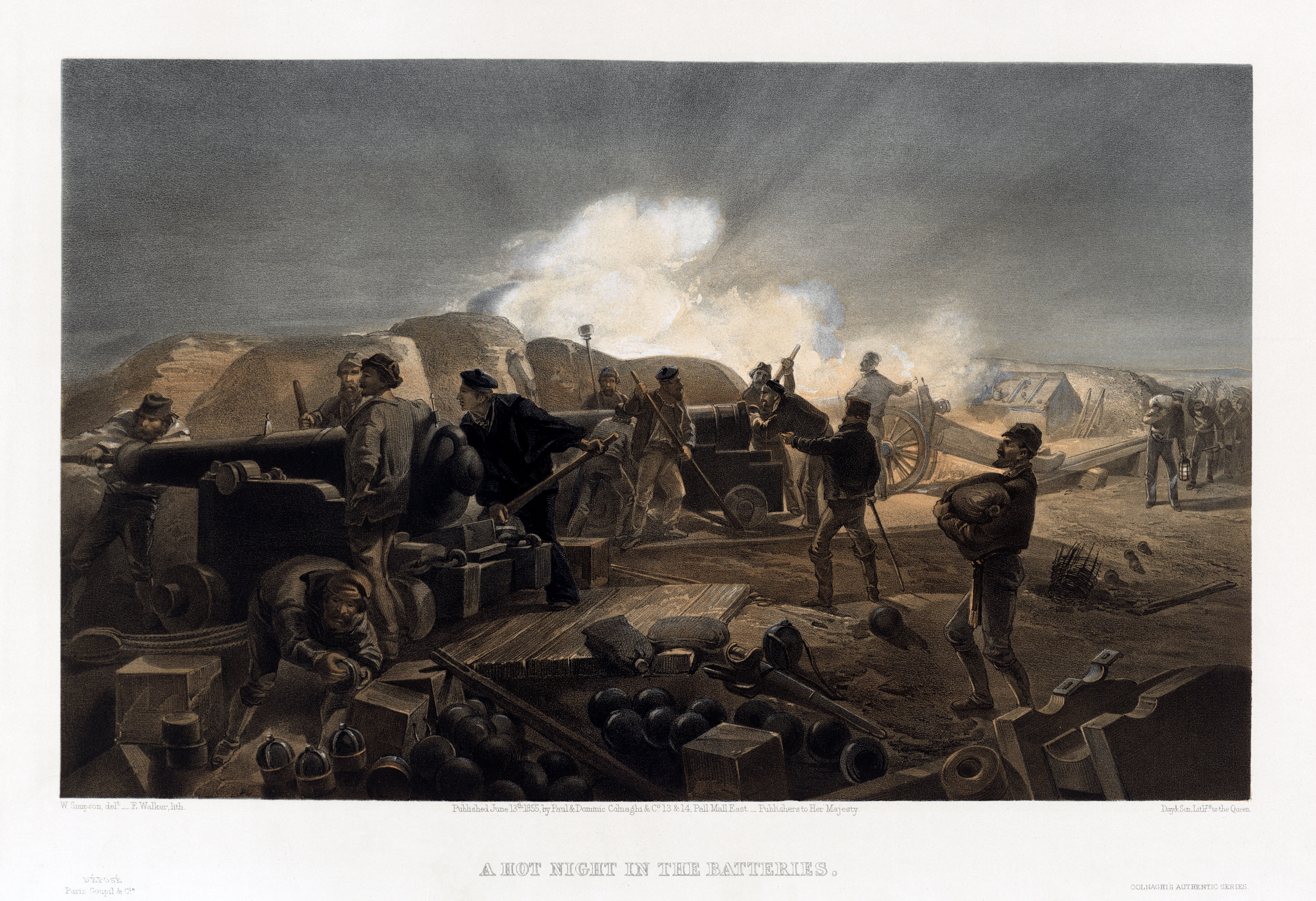
Illustration by William Simpson shows action in a British artillery battery during the Crimean War with cannon firing and being loaded and men bringing in supplies.

Cannons were crucial in Napoleon's rise to power, and continued to play an important role in his army in later years. During the French Revolution, the unpopularity of the Directory led to riots and rebellions. When over 25,000 royalists led by General Danican assaulted Paris, Paul Barras was appointed to defend the capital; outnumbered five to one and disorganised, the Republicans were desperate. When Napoleon arrived, he reorganised the defences but realised that without cannons the city could not be held. He ordered Joachim Murat to bring the guns from the Sablons artillery park; the Major and his cavalry fought their way to the recently captured cannons, and brought them back to Napoleon. When Danican's poorly trained men attacked, on 13 Vendémiaire 1795 (5 October in the calendar used in France at the time), Napoleon ordered his cannon to fire grapeshot into the mob, an act that became known as the "whiff of grapeshot". The slaughter effectively ended the threat to the new government, while, at the same time, making Bonaparte a famous—and popular—public figure. Among the first generals to recognise that artillery was not being used to its full potential, Napoleon often massed his cannon into batteries and introduced several changes into the French artillery, improving it significantly and making it among the finest in Europe. Such tactics were successfully used by the French, for example, at the Battle of Friedland, when 66 guns fired a total of 3,000 roundshot and 500 rounds of grapeshot, inflicting severe casualties to the Russian forces, whose losses numbered over 20,000 killed and wounded, in total. At the Battle of Waterloo—Napoleon's final battle—the French army had many more artillery pieces than either the British or Prussians. As the battlefield was muddy, recoil caused cannons to bury themselves into the ground after firing, resulting in slow rates of fire, as more effort was required to move them back into an adequate firing position; also, roundshot did not ricochet with as much force from the wet earth. Despite the drawbacks, sustained artillery fire proved deadly during the engagement, especially during the French cavalry attack. The British infantry, having formed infantry squares, took heavy losses from the French guns, while their own cannons fired at the cuirassiers and lancers, when they fell back to regroup. Eventually, the French ceased their assault, after taking heavy losses from the British cannon and musket fire.

In the 1810s and 1820s, greater emphasis was placed on the accuracy of long-range gunfire, and less on the weight of a broadside. Around 1822, George Marshall wrote Marshall's Practical Marine Gunnery. The book was used by cannon operators in the United States Navy throughout the 19th century. It listed all the types of cannons and instructions.

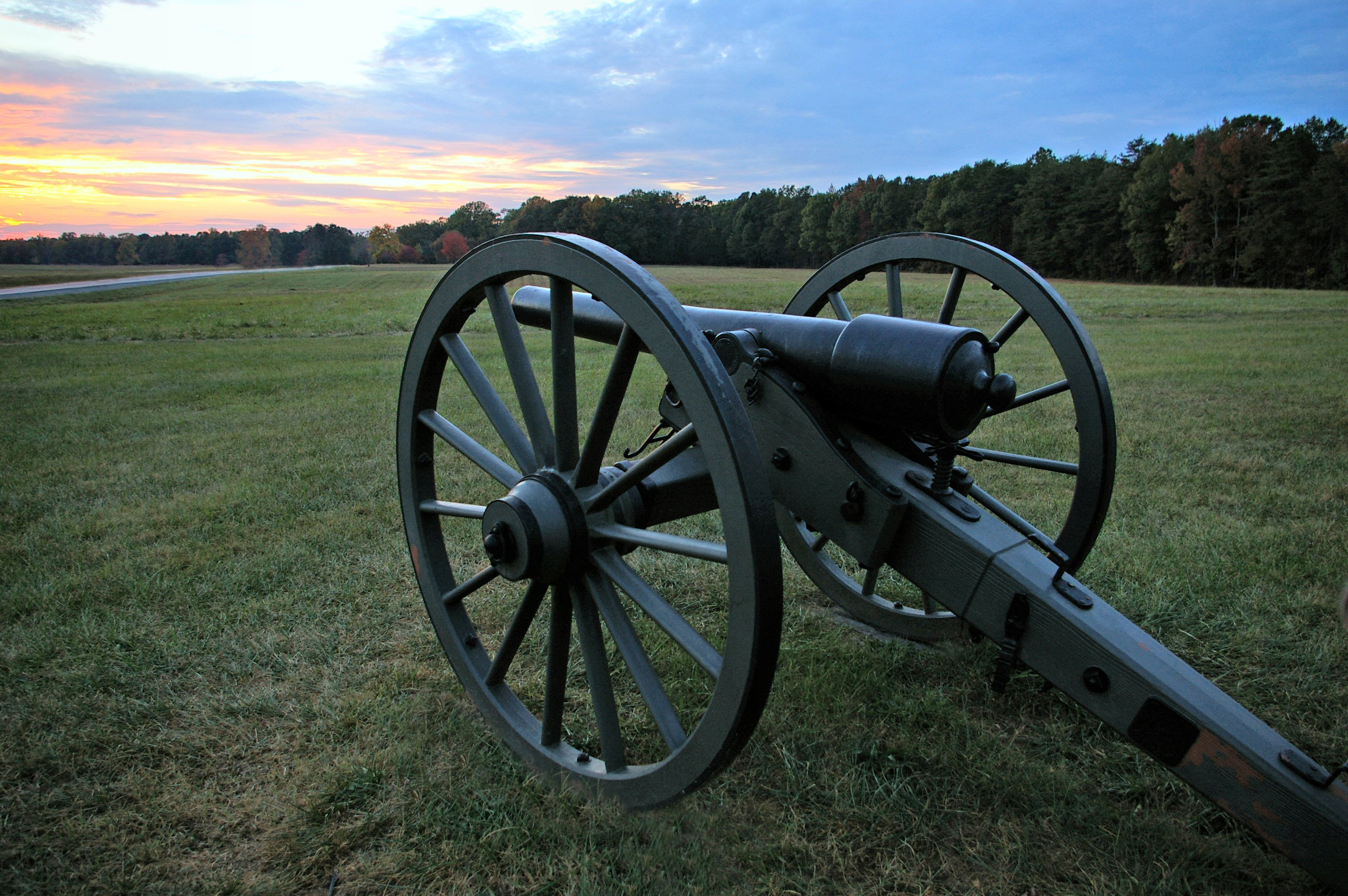
A 3-inch Parrott rifle from the Battle of Chancellorsville

The carronade, although initially very successful and widely adopted, disappeared from the Royal Navy in the 1850s after the development of wrought-iron-jacketed steel cannon by William Armstrong and Joseph Whitworth. Nevertheless, carronades were used in the American Civil War.

Western cannons during the 19th century became larger, more destructive, more accurate, and could fire at longer range. One example is the American 3-inch (76 mm) wrought-iron, muzzle-loading rifle, or Griffen gun (usually called the 3-inch Ordnance Rifle), used during the American Civil War, which had an effective range of over 1.1 mi (1.8 km). Another is the smoothbore 12-pounder Napoleon, which originated in France in 1853 and was widely used by both sides in the American Civil War. This cannon was renowned for its sturdiness, reliability, firepower, flexibility, relatively lightweight, and range of 1,700 m (5,600 ft).

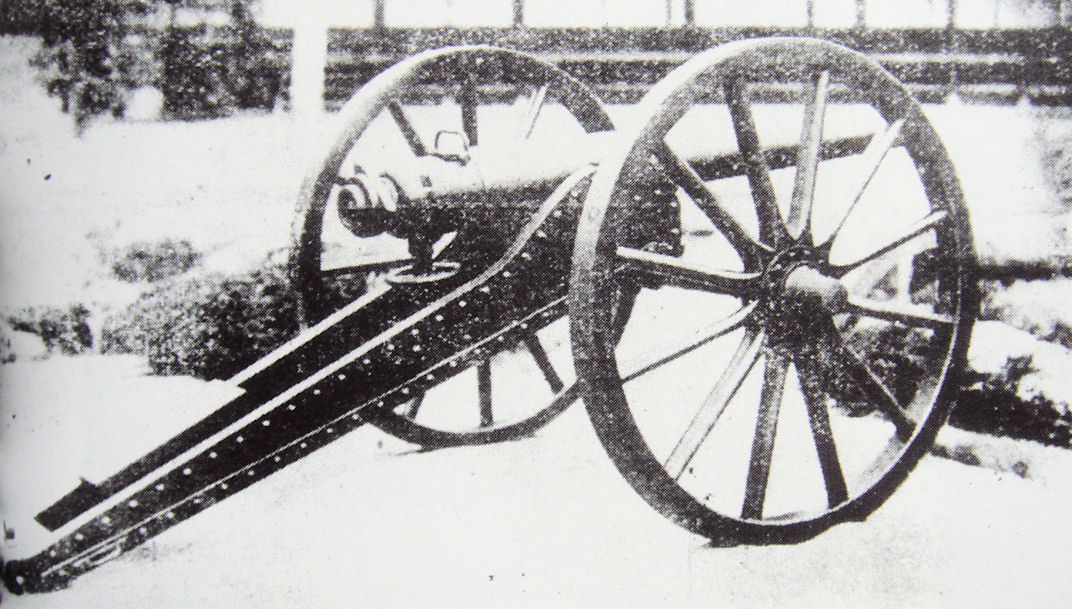
Armstrong gun deployed by Japan during the Boshin war (1868–69).

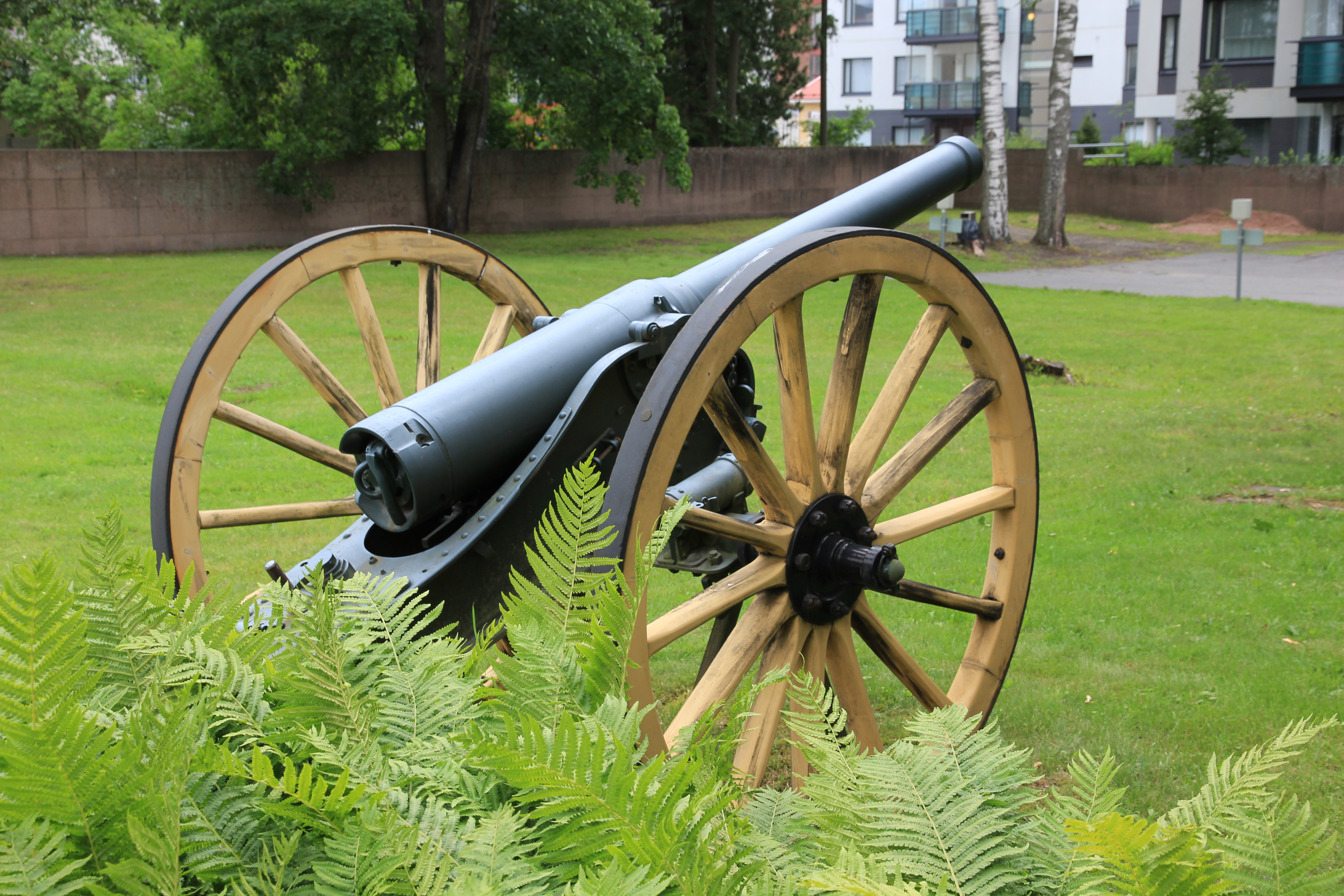
The 1870s de Bange 90 mm cannon on the yard of Eastern Finland military office in Mikkeli, South Savo, Finland

The practice of rifling—casting spiralling lines inside the cannon's barrel—was applied to artillery more frequently by 1855, as it gave cannon projectiles gyroscopic stability, which improved their accuracy. One of the earliest rifled cannons was the breech-loading Armstrong Gun—also invented by William Armstrong—which boasted significantly improved range, accuracy, and power than earlier weapons. The projectile fired from the Armstrong gun could reportedly pierce through a ship's side and explode inside the enemy vessel, causing increased damage and casualties. The British military adopted the Armstrong gun, and was impressed; the Duke of Cambridge even declared that it "could do everything but speak". Despite being significantly more advanced than its predecessors, the Armstrong gun was rejected soon after its integration, in favour of the muzzle-loading pieces that had been in use before. While both types of gun were effective against wooden ships, neither had the capability to pierce the armour of ironclads; due to reports of slight problems with the breeches of the Armstrong gun, and their higher cost, the older muzzle-loaders were selected to remain in service instead. Realising that iron was more difficult to pierce with breech-loaded cannons, Armstrong designed rifled muzzle-loading guns, which proved successful; The Times reported: "even the fondest believers in the invulnerability of our present ironclads were obliged to confess that against such artillery, at such ranges, their plates and sides were almost as penetrable as wooden ships."

The superior cannon of the Western world brought them tremendous advantages in warfare. For example, in the First Opium War in China, during the 19th century, British battleships bombarded the coastal areas and fortifications from afar, safe from the reach of the Chinese cannons. Similarly, the shortest war in recorded history, the Anglo-Zanzibar War of 1896, was brought to a swift conclusion by shelling from British cruisers. The cynical attitude towards recruited infantry in the face of ever more powerful field artillery is the source of the term cannon fodder, first used by François-René de Chateaubriand, in 1814; however, the concept of regarding soldiers as nothing more than "food for powder" was mentioned by William Shakespeare as early as 1598, in Henry IV, Part 1.

=== 20th and 21st centuries ===
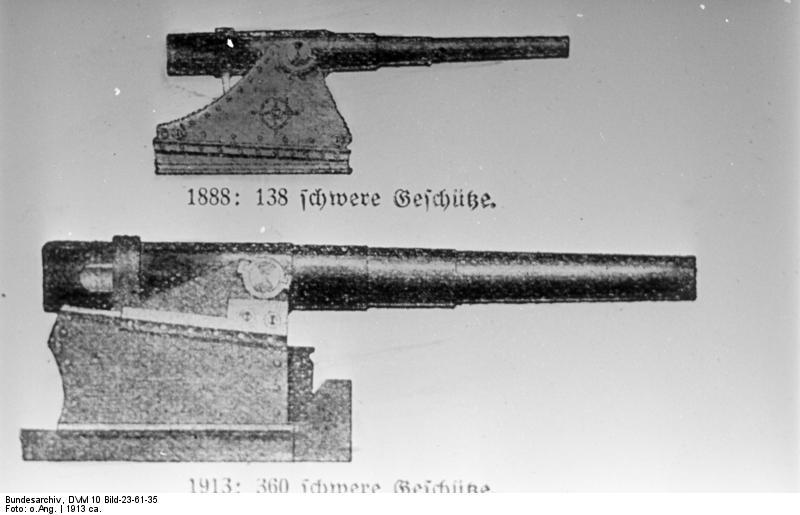
Comparison of 1888 and 1913 German cannon

Cannons in the 20th and 21st centuries are usually divided into sub-categories and given separate names. Some of the most widely used types of modern cannon are howitzers, mortars, guns, and autocannon, although a few very large-calibre cannon, custom-designed, have also been constructed. Nuclear artillery was experimented with, but was abandoned as impractical. Modern artillery is used in a variety of roles, depending on its type. According to NATO, the general role of artillery is to provide fire support, which is defined as "the application of fire, coordinated with the manoeuvre of forces to destroy, neutralize, or suppress the enemy".

When referring to cannons, the term gun is often used incorrectly. In military usage, a gun is a cannon with a high muzzle velocity and a flat trajectory, useful for hitting the sides of targets such as walls, as opposed to howitzers or mortars, which have lower muzzle velocities, and fire indirectly, lobbing shells up and over obstacles to hit the target from above.

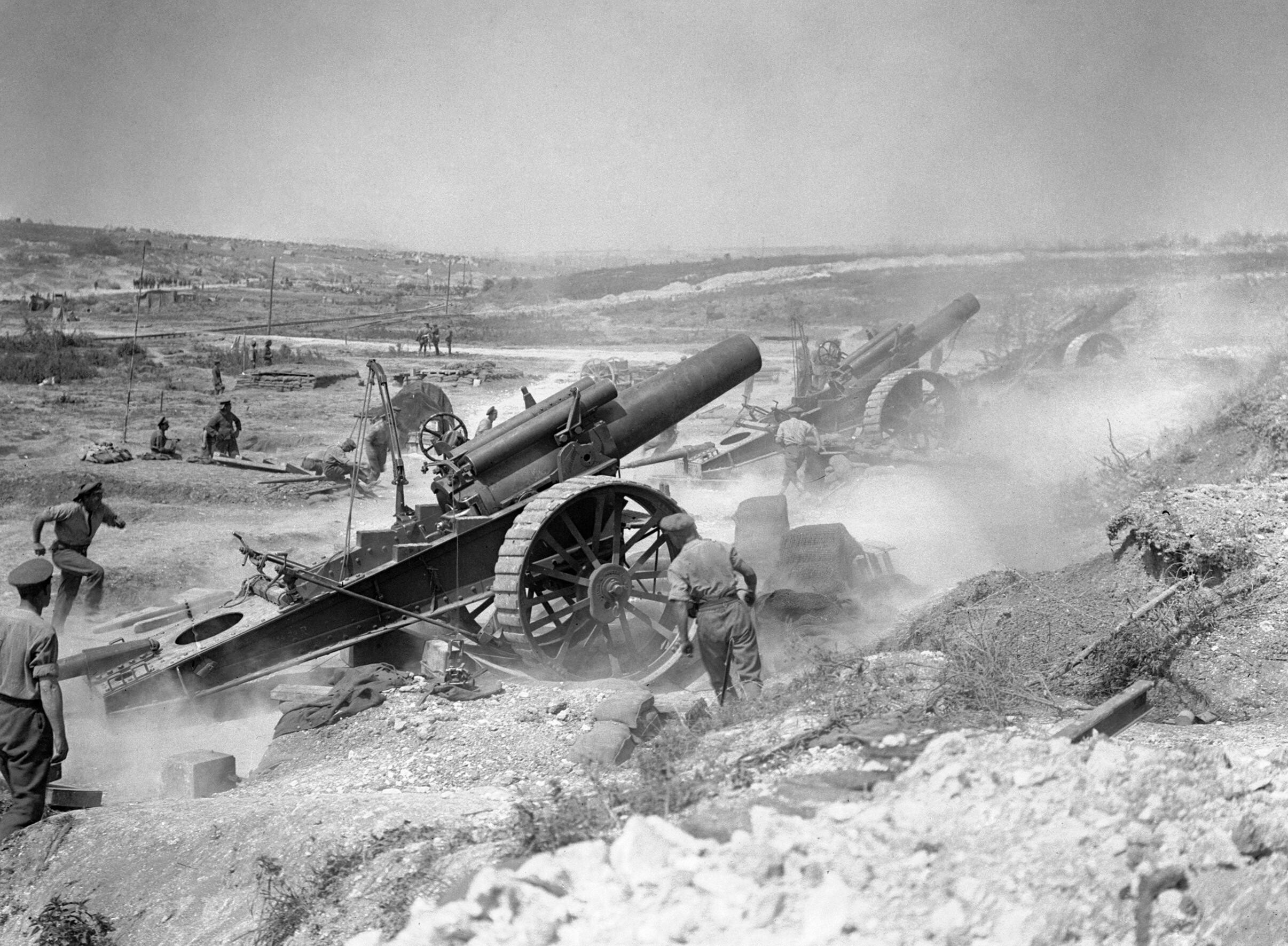
Royal Artillery howitzers at the Battle of the Somme

By the early 20th century, infantry weapons had become more powerful, forcing most artillery away from the front lines. Despite the change to indirect fire, cannons proved highly effective during World War I, directly or indirectly causing over 75% of casualties. The onset of trench warfare after the first few months of World War I greatly increased the demand for howitzers, as they were more suited to hitting targets in trenches. Furthermore, their shells carried more explosives than those of guns, and caused considerably less barrel wear. The German army had the advantage here as they began the war with many more howitzers than the French. World War I also saw the use of the Paris Gun, the longest-ranged gun ever fired. This 200 mm (8 in) calibre gun was used by the Germans against Paris and could hit targets more than 122 km (76 mi) away.

The Second World War sparked new developments in cannon technology. Among them were sabot rounds, hollow-charge projectiles, and proximity fuses, all of which increased the effectiveness of cannon against specific targets. The proximity fuse emerged on the battlefields of Europe in late December 1944. Used to great effect in anti-aircraft projectiles, proximity fuses were fielded in both the European and Pacific Theatres of Operations; they were particularly useful against V-1 flying bombs and kamikaze planes. Although widely used in naval warfare, and in anti-air guns, both the British and Americans feared unexploded proximity fuses would be reverse engineered, leading to them limiting their use in continental battles. During the Battle of the Bulge, however, the fuses became known as the American artillery's "Christmas present" for the German army because of their effectiveness against German personnel in the open, when they frequently dispersed attacks. Anti-tank guns were also tremendously improved during the war: in 1939, the British used primarily 2 pounder and 6 pounder guns. By the end of the war, 17 pounders had proven much more effective against German tanks, and 32 pounders had entered development. Meanwhile, German tanks were continuously upgraded with better main guns, in addition to other improvements. For example, the Panzer III was originally designed with a 37 mm gun, but was mass-produced with a 50 mm cannon. To counter the threat of the Russian T-34s, another, more powerful 50 mm gun was introduced, only to give way to a larger 75 mm cannon, which was in a fixed mount as the StuG III, the most-produced German World War II armoured fighting vehicle of any type. Despite the improved guns, production of the Panzer III was ended in 1943, as the tank still could not match the T-34, and was replaced by the Panzer IV and Panther tanks. In 1944, the 8.8 cm KwK 43 and many variations, entered service with the Wehrmacht, and was used as both a tank main gun, and as the PaK 43 anti-tank gun. One of the most powerful guns to see service in World War II, it was capable of destroying any Allied tank at very long ranges.

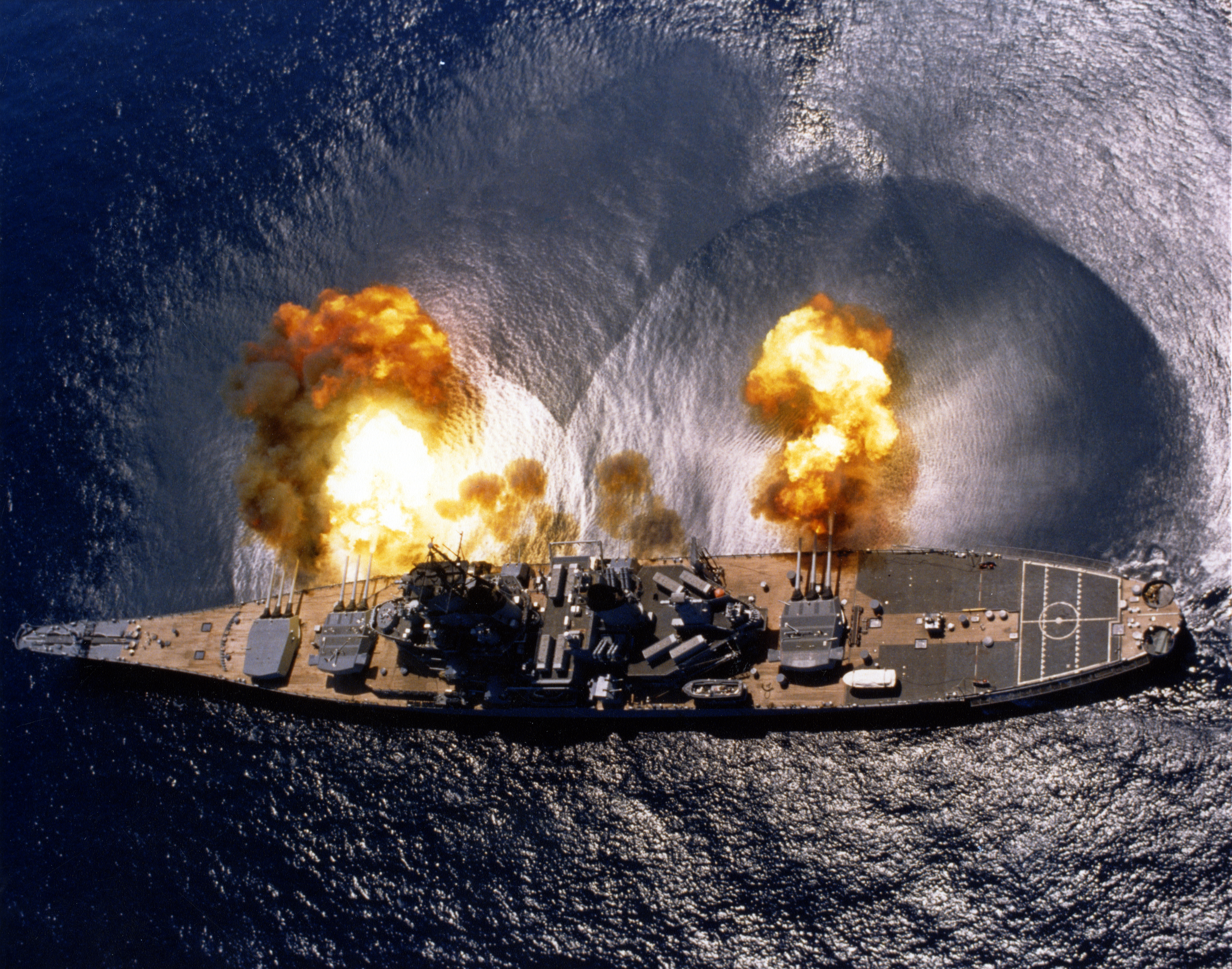
USS Iowa firing her 16 in (41 cm) guns

Despite being designed to fire at trajectories with a steep angle of descent, howitzers can be fired directly, as was done by the 11th Marine Regiment at the Battle of Chosin Reservoir, during the Korean War. Two field batteries fired directly upon a battalion of Chinese infantry; the Marines were forced to brace themselves against their howitzers, as they had no time to dig them in. The Chinese infantry took heavy casualties, and were forced to retreat.

The tendency to create larger calibre cannons during the World Wars has reversed since. The United States Army, for example, sought a lighter, more versatile howitzer, to replace their aging pieces. As it could be towed, the M198 was selected to be the successor to the World War II–era cannons used at the time, and entered service in 1979. Still in use today, the M198 is, in turn, being slowly replaced by the M777 Ultralightweight howitzer, which weighs nearly half as much and can be more easily moved. Although land-based artillery such as the M198 are powerful, long-ranged, and accurate, naval guns have not been neglected, despite being much smaller than in the past, and, in some cases, having been replaced by cruise missiles. However, the Zumwalt-class destroyer's planned armament included the Advanced Gun System (AGS), a pair of 155 mm guns, which fire the Long Range Land-Attack Projectile. The warhead, which weighed 24 pounds (11 kg), had a circular error of probability of 50 m (160 ft), and was mounted on a rocket, to increase the effective range to 100 nmi (190 km), further than that of the Paris Gun. The AGS's barrels would be water-cooled, and fire 10 rounds per minute, per gun. The combined firepower from both turrets would give a Zumwalt-class destroyer the firepower equivalent to 12 conventional M198 howitzers. The reason for the re-integration of cannons as a main armament in United States Navy ships was because satellite-guided munitions fired from a gun would be less expensive than a cruise missile but have a similar guidance capability.

==== Autocannon ====
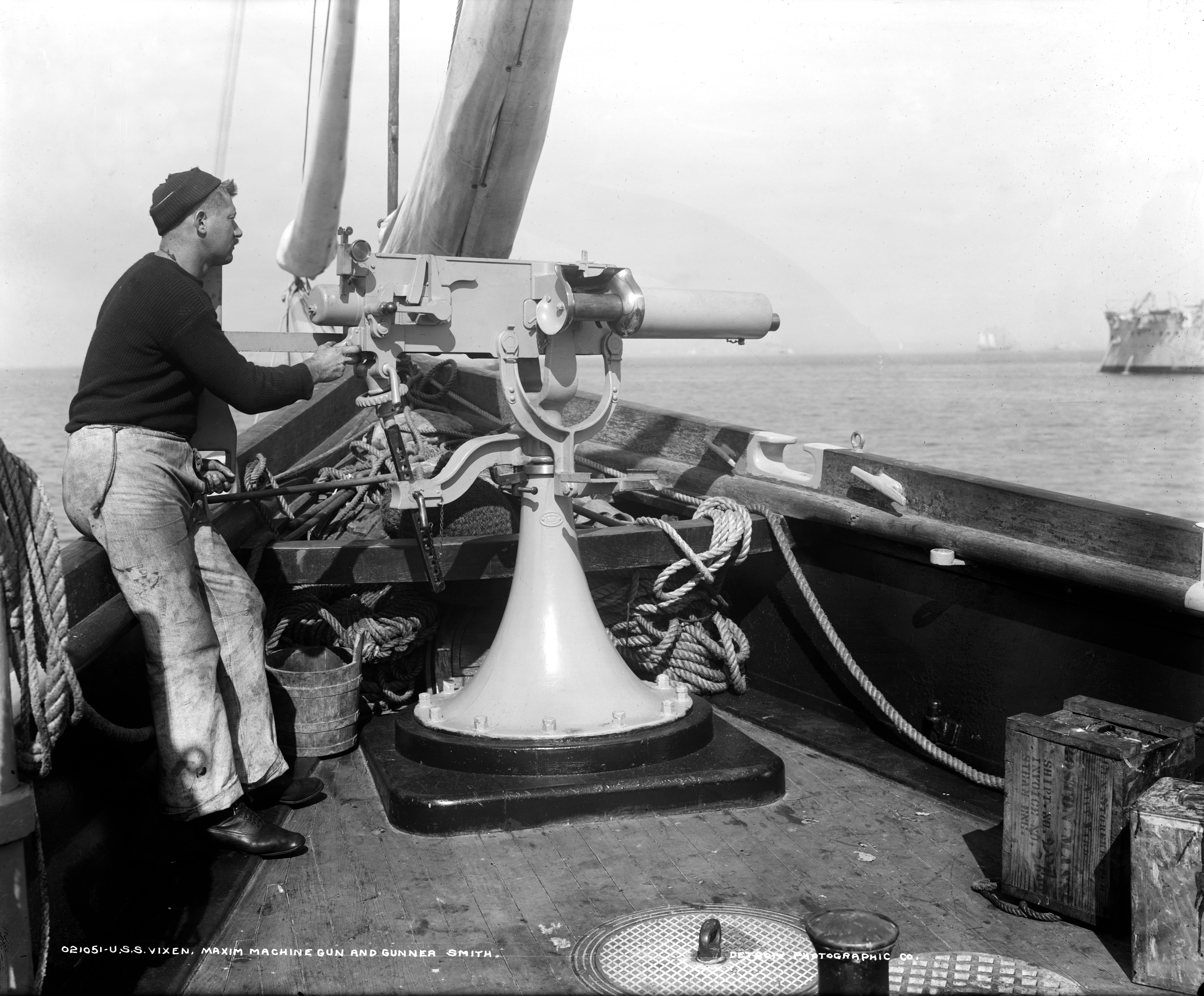
A large bore Maxim on USS Vixen c. 1898

Autocannons automatically fire a series of projectiles, similarly to a machine gun. They have mechanisms to automatically load their ammunition, and have a high rate of fire often approaching, or, in the case of rotary autocannons, even surpassing the firing rate of a machine gun. Autocannons are usually of larger calibre than machine guns, typically 20 mm (0.8 in) or greater, and can usually fire explosive shells, unlike machine guns. Explosive ammunition weighing less than 400 grams, as used by machine-gun calibres, is additionally banned in international conflict for parties to the Saint Petersburg Declaration of 1868.

Most nations use rapid-fire cannon on light vehicles, instead of a more powerful, but heavier, tank gun with a low rate of fire. A typical autocannon is the 25 mm US "Bushmaster" chain gun, mounted on the LAV-25 and M2 Bradley armoured vehicles. Autocannons may be capable of a very high rate of fire, but ammunition is heavy and bulky limiting the amount that can be carried, and the rate of fire is often kept lower—for example by the 25 mm Bushmaster and the 30 mm RARDEN—than the maximum attainable to increase the firing duration of a load of ammunition. The typical rate of fire for a modern autocannon ranges from 90 to 1,800 rounds per minute; systems with multiple barrels, such as rotary autocannon, can have rates of fire of several thousand rounds per minute. The fastest of these is the GSh-6-23, which has a rate of fire of over 10,000 rounds per minute.

Autocannons are often fitted in aircraft and as shipboard anti-aircraft weapons, as they provide greater destructive power than previously used machine guns.

==== Aircraft use ====
The first documented installation of a cannon firing explosive shells on an aircraft was on the Voisin Canon in 1911, displayed at the Paris Exposition that year. By World War I, all of the major powers were experimenting with aircraft-mounted cannons; however, their low rate of fire and great size and weight precluded any of them from being anything other than experimental. The most successful (or least unsuccessful) was the SPAD 12 Ca.1 single-seat fighter with a single 37 mm Puteaux mounted to fire between the cylinder banks and through the propeller boss of the aircraft's Hispano-Suiza 8C engine. The pilot (by necessity an ace) had to manually load one round at a time.

The first autocannon were developed during World War I as anti-aircraft guns, and one of these, the Coventry Ordnance Works "COW 37 mm gun", was installed in an aircraft. However, the war ended before it could be given a field trial, and it never became standard equipment in a production aircraft. Later trials had it fixed at a steep angle upwards in both the Vickers Type 161 and the Westland C.O.W. Gun Fighter, an idea that returned later.

During this period autocannons became available, and several fighters of the German Luftwaffe and the Imperial Japanese Navy Air Service were fitted with 20 mm cannons. They continued to be installed as an adjunct to machine guns rather than as a replacement, as the rate of fire was too low and each gun was too heavy. There was some debate in the RAF as to whether the greater number of possible rounds being fired from a machine gun, or a smaller number of explosive rounds from a cannon was preferable. Improvements during the war in regards to rate of fire allowed the cannon to displace the machine gun almost entirely.

Cannons were more effective than machine-guns against armour, so they came increasingly into use in World War II; newer fighter aircraft such as the Hawker Tempest usually carried two or four instead of the six to twelve machine guns of earlier aircraft. The Hispano-Suiza HS.404, Oerlikon 20 mm cannon, MG FF, and their numerous variants became among the most widely used autocannon in the war. Aircraft cannons, as with machine guns, were either fixed to fire forwards (mounted in the wings, in the nose or fuselage, or in a pannier under either), typically on manoeuvrable fighters, or mounted movably in manned gun turrets on heavier less agile aircraft such as bombers. Both the Germans and Japanese mounted cannons to fire upwards and forwards for use against heavy bombers, with the Germans calling guns so-installed Schräge Musik, derived from a German colloquialism for jazz music—schräg means "off-key".

With the post-war introduction of high-speed jet aircraft and development of air-to-air missiles there was a move to omit cannon, considered useless compared to missiles in a dogfight, but combat experience during the Vietnam War (from 1955) showed conclusively that there was still a need for cannon. Nearly all modern fighter aircraft are armed with an autocannon, and they are also commonly fitted on ground-attack aircraft. One of the most powerful examples is the 30mm GAU-8/A Avenger Gatling-type rotary cannon mounted on the Fairchild Republic A-10 Thunderbolt II. The Lockheed AC-130 gunship, based on a transport aircraft, can carry a 105 mm howitzer and a variety of autocannons ranging up to 40 mm. Both are used in the close air support role.

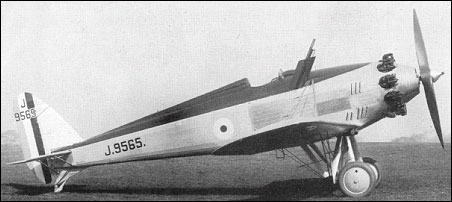
Westland C.O.W. Gun Fighter with 37 mm C.O.W. gun mounted to fire upwards

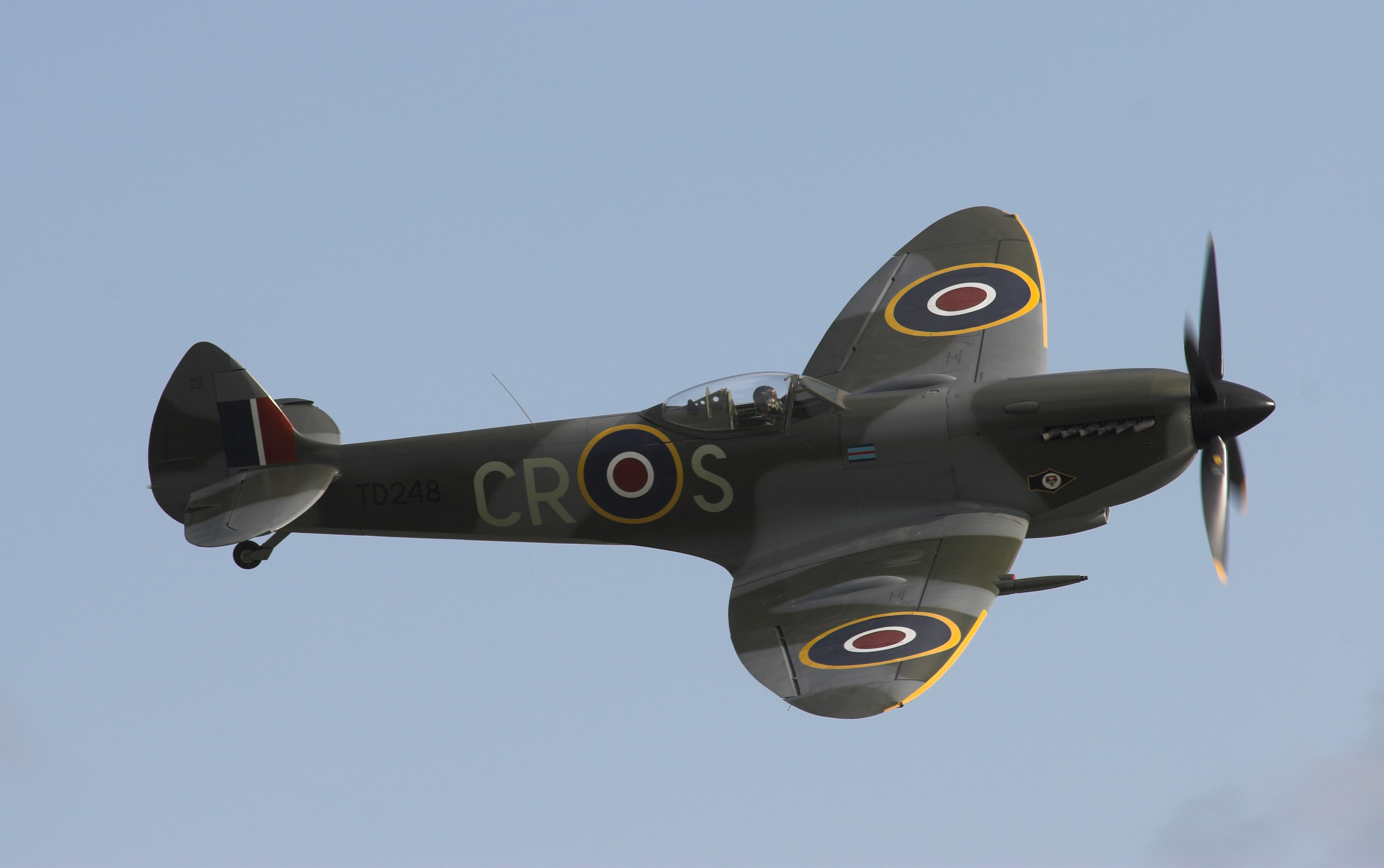
Supermarine Spitfire with 20 mm cannon protruding from the leading edge of the wing

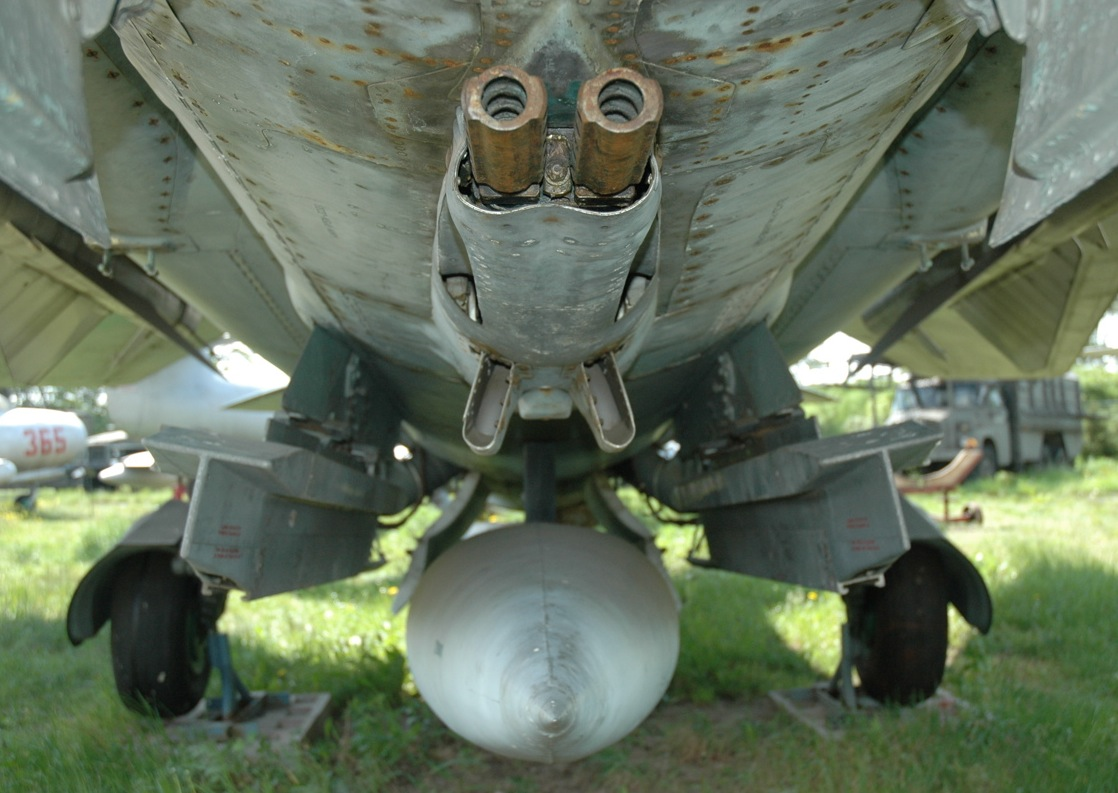
GSh-23 autocannon mounted on the underside of a Mikoyan-Gurevich MiG-23

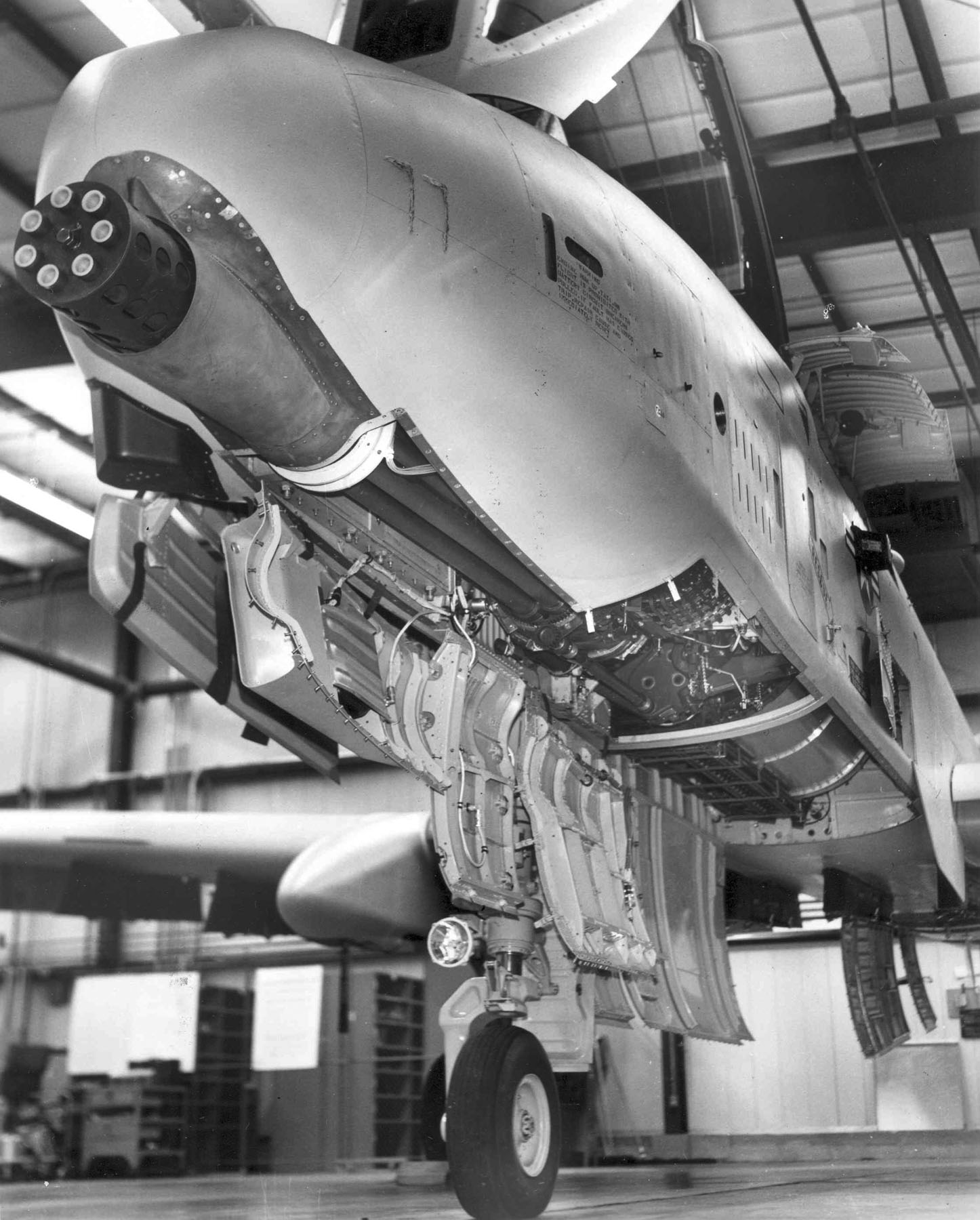
The GAU-8/A Avenger rotary cannon, mounted in a Fairchild A-10 Thunderbolt II

== Composition ==
Side elevation of a typical 18th-century cannon

Cannons in general have the form of a truncated cone with an internal cylindrical bore for holding an explosive charge and a projectile. The thickest, strongest, and closed part of the cone is located near the explosive charge. As any explosive charge will dissipate in all directions equally, the thickest portion of the cannon is useful for containing and directing this force. The backward motion of the cannon as its projectile leaves the bore is termed its recoil, and the effectiveness of the cannon can be measured in terms of how much this response can be diminished, though obviously diminishing recoil through increasing the overall mass of the cannon means decreased mobility.

Field artillery cannon in Europe and the Americas were initially made most often of bronze, though later forms were constructed of cast iron and eventually steel. Bronze has several characteristics that made it preferable as a construction material: although it is relatively expensive, does not always alloy well, and can result in a final product that is "spongy about the bore", bronze is more flexible than iron and therefore less prone to bursting when exposed to high pressure; cast-iron cannon are less expensive and more durable generally than bronze and withstand being fired more times without deteriorating. However, cast-iron cannon have a tendency to burst without having shown any previous weakness or wear, and this makes them more dangerous to operate.

The older and more-stable forms of cannon were muzzle-loading as opposed to breech-loading—to be used they had to have their ordnance packed down the bore through the muzzle rather than inserted through the breech.

The following terms refer to the components or aspects of a classical western cannon (c. 1850) as illustrated here. In what follows, the words near, close, and behind will refer to those parts towards the thick, closed end of the piece, and far, front, in front of, and before to the thinner, open end.

=== Negative spaces ===
Bore
The hollow cylinder bored lengthwise down the centre of the cannon, including the base of the bore or bottom of the bore, the nearest end of the bore in which the ordnance (wadding, shot, etc.) rests just before firing. A cannon's calibre is determined by the diameter of its bore.
Chamber
The cylindrical, conical, or spherical recess at the nearest end of the bottom of the bore into which the gunpowder is packed.
Vent
A thin tube on the near end of the cannon connecting the explosive charge inside with an ignition source outside and often filled with a length of fuse; always located near the breech. Sometimes called the fuse hole or the touch hole. On the top of the vent on the outside of the cannon is a flat circular space called the vent field where the charge is lit. If the cannon is bronze, it will often have a vent piece made of copper screwed into the length of the vent.

=== Solid spaces ===
The main body of a cannon consists of three basic extensions: the foremost and the longest is called the chase, the middle portion is the reinforce, and the closest and briefest portion is the cascabel or cascable.

The chase is simply the entire conical part of the cannon in front of the reinforce. It is the longest portion of the cannon, and includes the following elements:

Neck
the narrowest part of the chase, always located near the foremost end of the piece.
Muzzle
the portion of the chase forward of the neck. It includes the following:

- Swell of the muzzle refers to the slight swell in the diameter of the piece at the very end of the chase. It is often chamfered on the inside to make loading the cannon easier. In some guns, this element is replaced with a wide ring and is called a muzzle band.
- Face is the flat vertical plane at the foremost edge of the muzzle (and of the entire piece).
- Muzzle mouldings are the tiered rings which connect the face with the rest of the muzzle, the first of which is called the lip and the second the fillet
- Muzzle astragal and fillets are a series of three narrow rings running around the outside of the chase just behind the neck. Sometimes also collectively called the chase ring.

Chase astragal and fillets
these are a second series of such rings located at the near end of the chase.
Chase girdle
this is the brief length of the chase between the chase astragal and fillets and the reinforce.
Reinforce
This portion of the piece is frequently divided into a first reinforce and a second reinforce, but in any case is marked as separate from the chase by the presence of a narrow circular reinforce ring or band at its foremost end. The span of the reinforce also includes the following:

- Trunnions are located at the foremost end of the reinforce just behind the reinforce ring. They consist of two cylinders perpendicular to the bore and below it which are used to mount the cannon on its carriage.
- Rimbases are short broad rings located at the union of the trunnions and the cannon which provide support to the carriage attachment.
- Reinforce band is only present if the cannon has two reinforces, and it divides the first reinforce from the second.
- Breech refers to the mass of solid metal behind the bottom of the bore extending to the base of the breech and including the base ring; it also generally refers to the end of the cannon opposite the muzzle, i.e., the location where the explosion of the gunpowder begins as opposed to the opening through which the pressurized gas escapes.
- Base ring forms a ring at the widest part of the entire cannon at the nearest end of the reinforce just before the cascabel.

Cascabel
This is that portion of the cannon behind the reinforce(s) and behind the base ring. It includes the following:

- Knob which is the small spherical terminus of the piece;
- Neck, a short, narrow piece of metal holding out the knob; and
- Fillet, the tiered disk connecting the neck of the cascabel to the base of the breech.
- Base of the breech is the metal disk that forms the most forward part of the cascabel and rests against the breech itself, right next to the base ring.

To pack a muzzle-loading cannon, first gunpowder is poured down the bore. This is followed by a layer of wadding (often nothing more than paper), and then the cannonball itself. A certain amount of windage (in this case meaning that the bore is designed slightly wider than the cannonball) allows the ball to fit down the bore, though the greater the windage the less efficient the propulsion of the ball when the gunpowder is ignited. To fire the cannon, the fuse located in the vent is lit, quickly burning down to the gunpowder, which then explodes violently, propelling wadding and ball down the bore and out of the muzzle. A small portion of exploding gas also escapes through the vent, but this does not dramatically affect the total force exerted on the ball.

Any large, smoothbore, muzzle-loading gun—used before the advent of breech-loading, rifled guns—may be referred to as a cannon, though once standardised names were assigned to different-sized cannon, the term specifically referred to a gun designed to fire a 42-pound (19 kg) shot, as distinct from a demi-cannon – 32 pounds (15 kg), culverin – 18 pounds (8.2 kg), or demi-culverin – 9 pounds (4.1 kg). Gun in this context specifically refers to a type of cannon that fires projectiles at high speeds, and usually at relatively low angles; they have been used in warships, and as field artillery. The term cannon is also used for autocannon, a modern repeating weapon firing explosive projectiles. Cannon have been used extensively in fighter aircraft since World War II.

== Operation ==
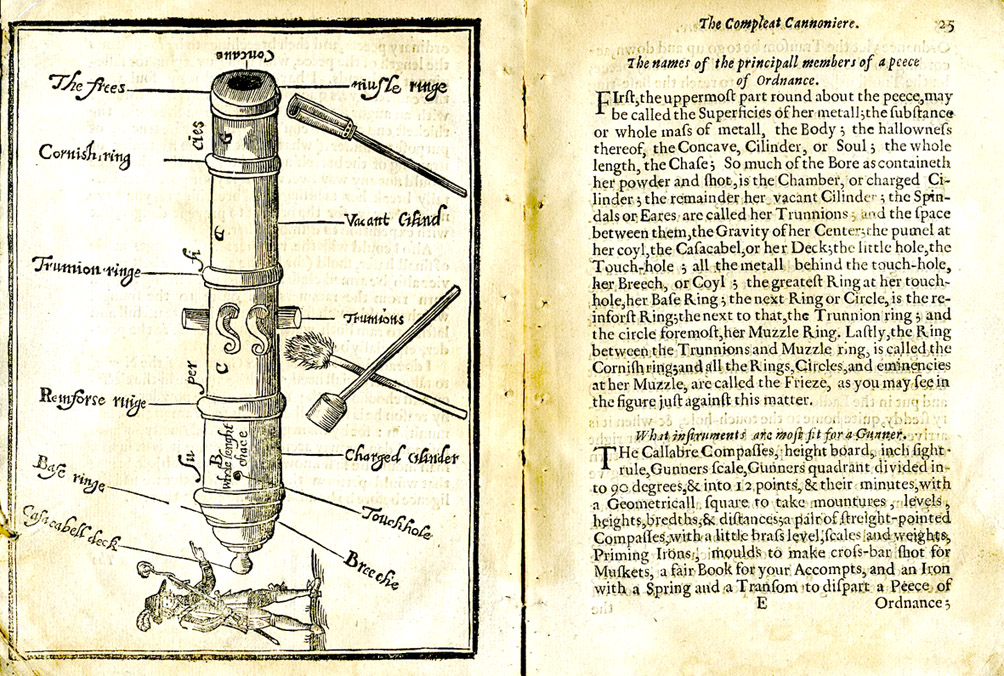
The parts of a cannon described in John Roberts' The Compleat Cannoniere, London, 1652

Firing of a field gun of the early 17th century with a linstock

In the 1770s, cannon operation worked as follows: each cannon would be manned by two gunners, six soldiers, and four officers of artillery. The right gunner was to prime the piece and load it with powder, and the left gunner would fetch the powder from the magazine and be ready to fire the cannon at the officer's command. On each side of the cannon, three soldiers stood, to ram and sponge the cannon, and hold the ladle. The second soldier on the left was tasked with providing 50 bullets.

Before loading, the cannon would be cleaned with a wet sponge to extinguish any smouldering material from the last shot. Fresh powder could be set off prematurely by lingering ignition sources. The powder was added, followed by wadding of paper or hay, and the ball was placed in and rammed down. After ramming, the cannon would be aimed with the elevation set using a quadrant and a plummet. At 45 degrees, the ball had the utmost range: about ten times the gun's level range. Any angle above a horizontal line was called random-shot. Wet sponges were used to cool the pieces every ten or twelve rounds.

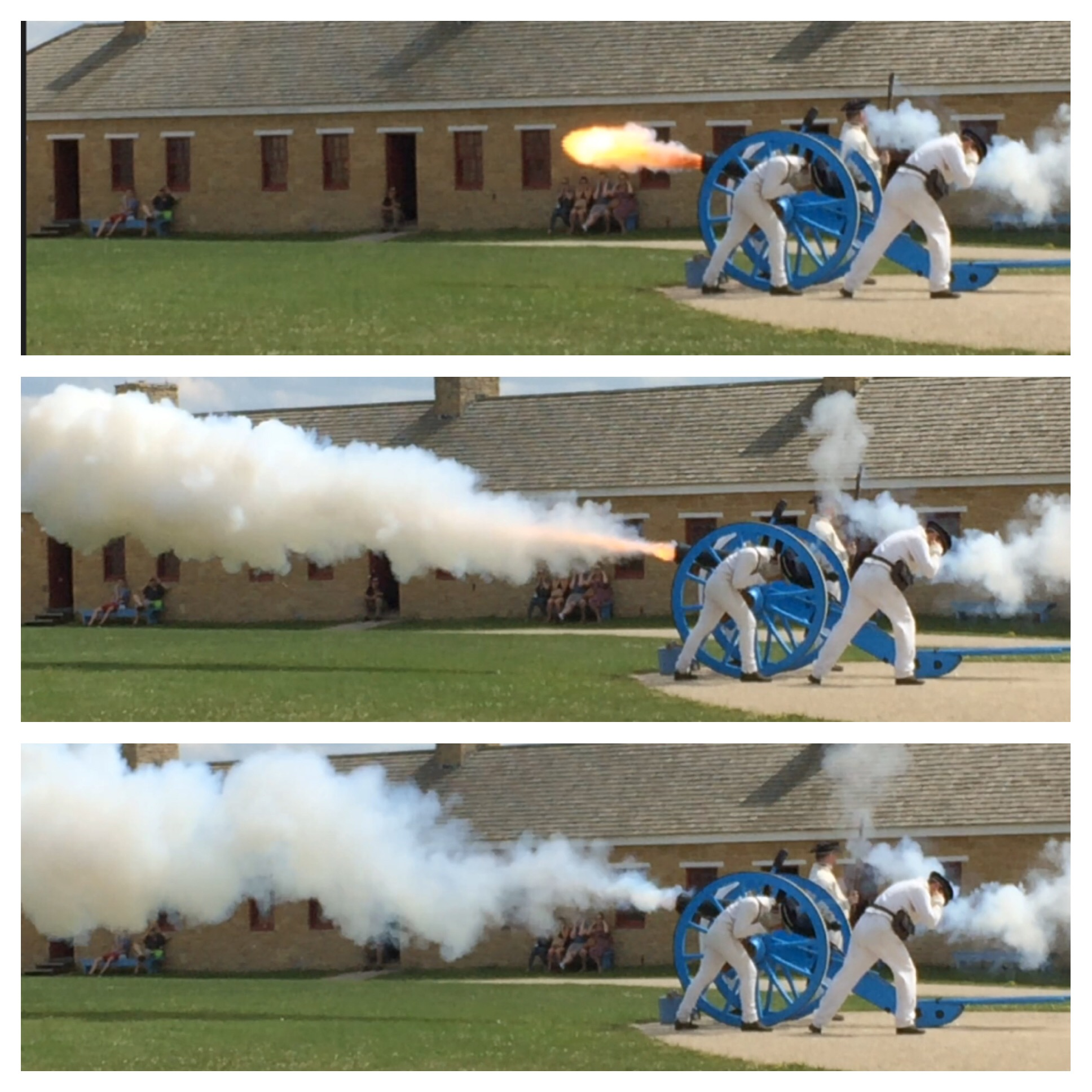
Firing of a 6-pound cannon

During the Napoleonic Wars, a British gun team consisted of five gunners to aim it, clean the bore with a damp sponge to quench any remaining embers before a fresh charge was introduced, and another to load the gun with a bag of powder and then the projectile. The fourth gunner pressed his thumb on the vent hole, to prevent a draught that might fan a flame. The charge loaded, the fourth would prick the bagged charge through the vent hole, and fill the vent with powder. On command, the fifth gunner would fire the piece with a slow match. Friction primers replaced slow match ignition by the mid-19th century.

When a cannon had to be abandoned such as in a retreat or surrender, the touch hole of the cannon would be plugged flush with an iron spike, disabling the cannon (at least until metal boring tools could be used to remove the plug). This was called "spiking".

A gun was said to be honeycombed when the surface of the bore had cavities, or holes in it, caused by corrosion or casting defects.

== Legislation ==
In the United States, muzzleloading cannons made before 1899 (and replicas) that are unable to fire fixed ammunition are considered antiques. They are not subject to the Gun Control Act of 1968 or National Firearms Act of 1934. They may be subject to local rules in some jurisdictions, however.

== Deceptive imitations ==
Historically, logs or poles have been used as decoys to mislead the enemy as to the strength of an emplacement. The "Quaker Gun trick" was used by Colonel William Washington's Continental Army during the American Revolutionary War; in 1780, approximately 100 Loyalists surrendered to them, rather than face bombardment. During the American Civil War, Quaker guns were also used by the Confederates, to compensate for their shortage of artillery. The decoy cannon were painted black at the "muzzle", and positioned behind fortifications to delay Union attacks on those positions. On occasion, real gun carriages were used to complete the deception.

== In popular culture ==
Cannon sounds have sometimes been used in classical pieces with a military theme. One of the best known examples is Pyotr Ilyich Tchaikovsky's 1812 Overture. The overture is to be performed using an artillery section together with the orchestra, resulting in noise levels high enough that musicians are required to wear ear protection. The cannon fire simulates Russian artillery bombardments of the Battle of Borodino, a critical battle in Napoleon's invasion of Russia, whose defeat the piece celebrates. When the overture was first performed, the cannon were fired by an electric current triggered by the conductor. However, the overture was not recorded with real cannon fire until Mercury Records and conductor Antal Doráti's 1958 recording of the Minnesota Orchestra. Cannon fire is also frequently used in presentations of the 1812 on American Independence Day, a tradition started by Arthur Fiedler of the Boston Pops in 1974.

The hard rock band AC/DC used cannon fire in their song "For Those About to Rock (We Salute You)", and in live shows replica Napoleonic cannons and pyrotechnics were used to perform the piece. A recording of that song has accompanied the firing of an authentic reproduction of a M1857 12-pounder Napoleon during Columbus Blue Jackets goal celebrations at Nationwide Arena since opening night of the 2007–08 season. The cannon is the focal point of the team's alternate logo on its third jerseys.

Cannons have been fired in touchdown celebrations by several American football teams including the San Diego Chargers. The Pittsburgh Steelers used one only during the 1962 campaign but discontinued it after Buddy Dial was startled by inadvertently running face-first into the cannon's smoky discharge in a 42–27 loss to the Dallas Cowboys.

== Restoration ==
Cannon recovered from the sea are often extensively damaged from exposure to salt water; electrolytic reduction treatment is required to forestall corrosion. The cannon is then washed in deionized water to remove the electrolyte, and is treated in tannic acid, which prevents further rust and gives the metal a bluish-black colour. Cannon on display may be protected from oxygen and moisture by a wax sealant. A coat of polyurethane may also be painted over the wax sealant, to prevent the cannon from attracting dust.

== See also ==
- List of artillery
