= Wuwei Bronze Cannon =

Bronze cannon discovered in China

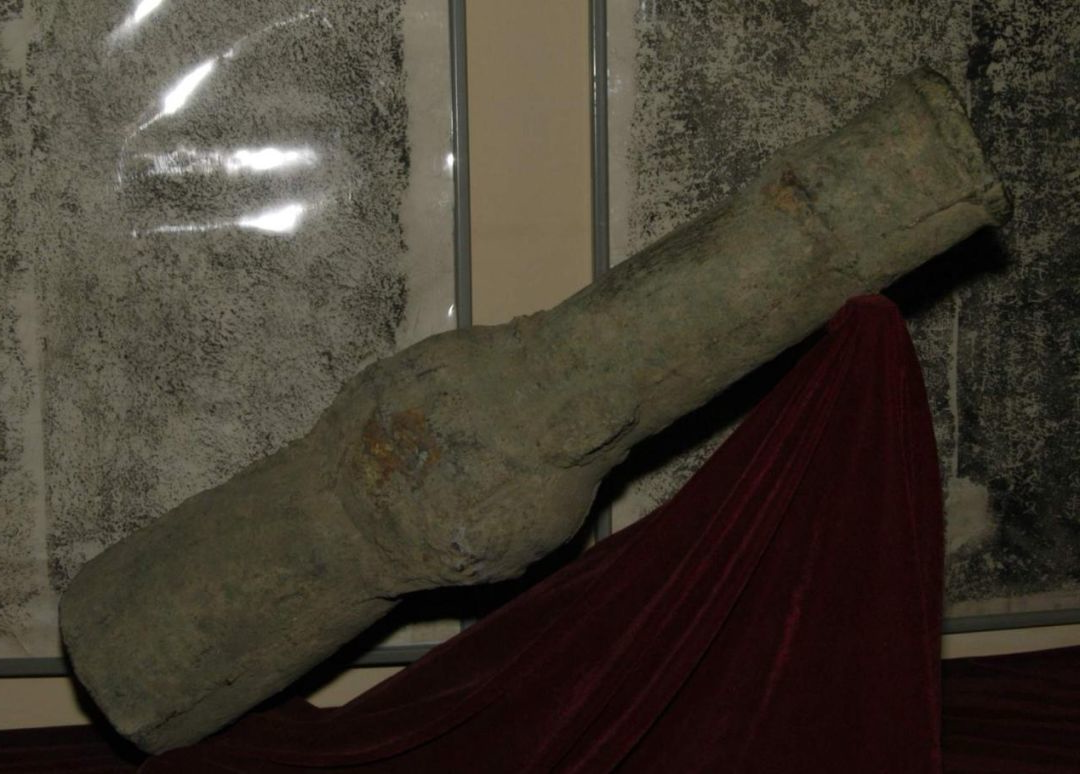
The Wuwei Bronze Cannon, a 108 kg bronze cannon dated to the late Western Xia (1214–1227), it bears no production date inscription and the dating is based on contextual evidence

The Wuwei Bronze Cannon (武威銅火炮 — Wǔwēi tóng huǒpào) or Xi Xia Bronze cannon (西夏铜火炮 — Xīxià tóng huǒpào) was discovered in 1980 and is probably the oldest and largest cannon dated to the 13th century. This 100 cm (39 in) long, 108 kg (238 lb) bronze cannon was discovered in a cellar in Wuwei, Gansu Province. It bears no inscription, but has been dated by historians to the late Western Xia period between 1214 and 1227 through contextual evidence. The gun contained an iron ball about nine centimeters in diameter, vastly narrower than the twelve centimeter muzzle diameter, and 0.1 kg (0.22 lb) of gunpowder in it when discovered, meaning that the projectile might have been another co-viative fired along with other small projectiles such as porcelain shards or metal scraps. Ben Sinvany and Dang Shoushan believe that the ball used to be much larger prior to its highly corroded state at the time of discovery. While large in size, the weapon is noticeably more primitive than later Yuan dynasty guns such as the Xanadu Gun and Heilongjiang hand cannon, and is unevenly cast. A similar weapon was discovered not far from the discovery site in 1997, but is much smaller in size at only 1.5 kg (3.3 lb).

Chen Bingying disputes the impact of these discoveries, and argues there were no guns before 1259, while Dang Shoushan believes the Western Xia guns point to the appearance of guns by 1220, and Stephen Haw goes even further by stating that guns were developed as early as 1200. Sinologist Joseph Needham and renaissance siege expert Thomas Arnold provide a more conservative estimate of around 1280 for the appearance of the "true" cannon. Whether or not any of these are correct, it seems likely that the gun was born sometime during the 13th century.

== See also ==
- Hu dun pao, a term that refers to trebuchet and cannon.
- Heilongjiang hand cannon, hand cannon, ca. 1287–1288.
- Xanadu gun, a bowl-mouthed cannon, 1298.
- Huochong, Chinese term for hand cannon.
- Gunpowder weapons in the Song dynasty
- Military of the Yuan dynasty

== Bibliography ==
- Andrade, Tonio (2016), The Gunpowder Age: China, Military Innovation, and the Rise of the West in World History, Princeton University Press, ISBN 978-0-691-13597-7.
- Arnold, Thomas (2001), The Renaissance at War, Cassell & Co, ISBN 0-304-35270-5
- Needham, Joseph (1971), Science and Civilization in China Volume 4 Part 3, Cambridge At The University Press
- Needham, Joseph (1980), Science and Civilisation in China Volume 5 Part 7, Cambridge University Press, ISBN 0-521-08573-X
- Needham, Joseph (1986), Science and Civilisation in China Volume 5 Part 7 The Gunpowder Epic, Cambridge University Press, ISBN 0-521-30358-3.
