= Xanadu Gun =

Oldest extant gun

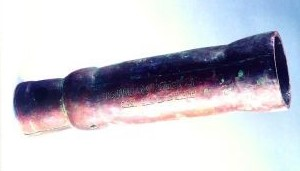
The Xanadu Gun in 2021

The oldest extant gun bearing a date of production is the Xanadu Gun, so called because it was discovered in the ruins of Xanadu (Shangdu), the summer palace of the Yuan dynasty in Inner Mongolia, China. The Xanadu Gun is 34.7 cm (13.7 in) in length and weighs 6.21 kg (13.7 lb), its muzzle is flared outwards, slightly bowl-shape, and called by Chinese as 碗口铳 (Wǎn kǒu chòng, literally bowl-mouthed gun). Its dating is based on archaeological context and a straightforward inscription containing an era name and year that correspond with the Gregorian Calendar at 1298. Not only does the inscription contain the era name and date, it also includes a serial number and manufacturing information which suggests that gun production had already become systematized, or at least become a somewhat standardized affair by the time of its fabrication. The design of the gun includes axial holes in its rear which some speculate could have been used in a mounting mechanism. Like most early guns with the possible exception of the Western Xia gun (the Wuwei bronze cannon), it is small, weighing just over 6 kg (13 lb) and 35 cm (14 in) in length. Although the Xanadu Gun is the most precisely dated gun from the 13th century, other extant samples with approximate dating may be older.

== See also ==
- Gunpowder weapons in the Song dynasty
- Military of the Yuan dynasty
- Wuwei Bronze Cannon, late Western Xia (1214–1227).
- Heilongjiang hand cannon, circa 1287–1288.
- Huochong, a Chinese term for firearms
- Hu Dun Pao, a term referring to both a cannon and a trebuchet.

== Bibliography ==
- Andrade, Tonio (2016), The gunpowder age: China, military innovation, and the rise of the west in world history, Princeton University Press, ISBN 978-0-691-13597-7.
