= Huochong =

Chinese name for hand cannons

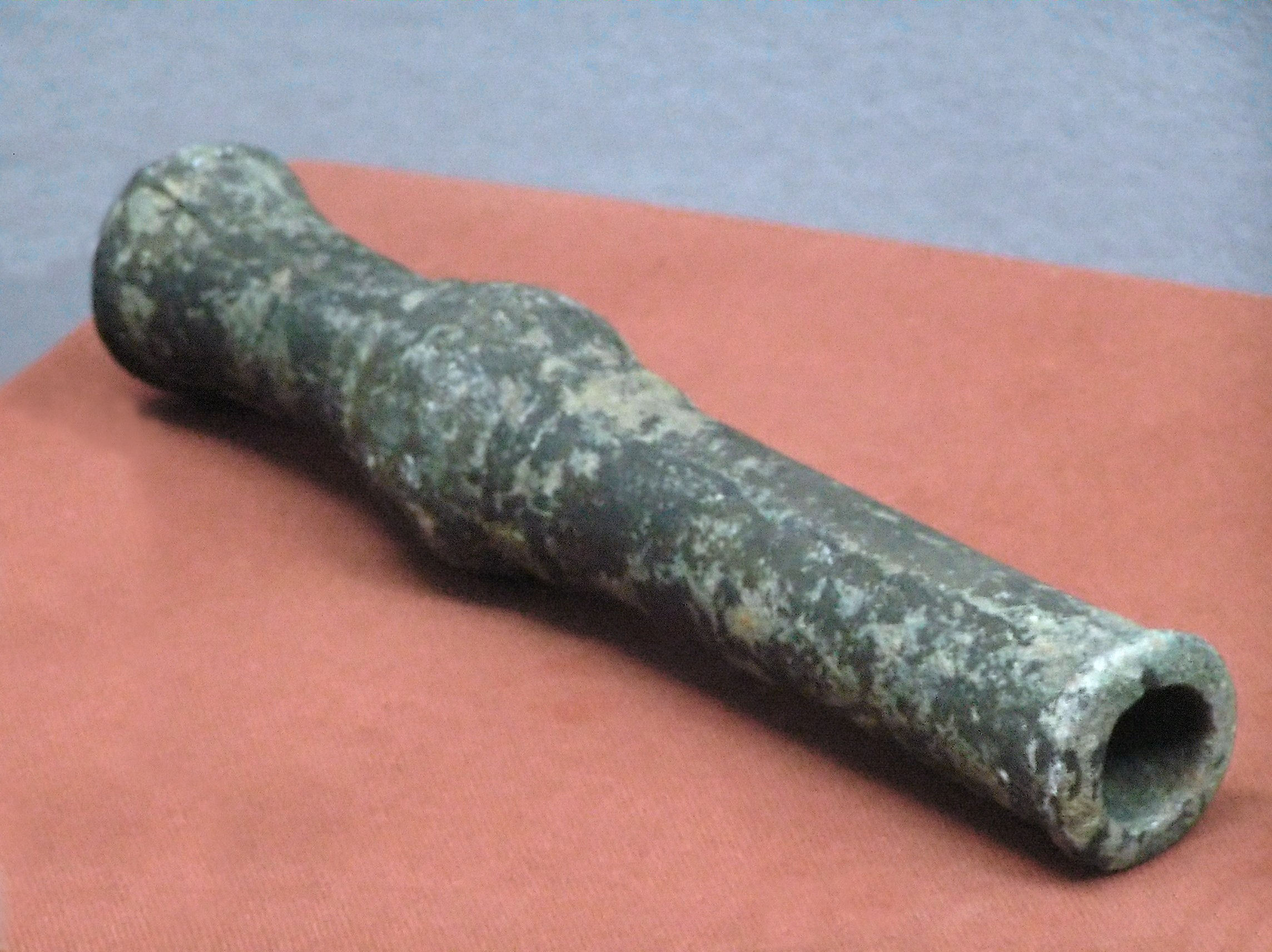
Hand cannon from the Chinese Yuan Dynasty (1271–1368)

Huochong (simplified Chinese: 火铳; traditional Chinese: 火銃) is a Chinese name for firearms. In pre-modern China, the terms chong and pao were used interchangeably at times without clearly distinguishing between a gun and cannon. By the early Ming dynasty (1368–1644), it could refer to both cannons or hand cannons. The term chong has been applied to numerous types of firearm weapons in China, including the hand cannons (shou chong), bowl-mouth cannons (wankou chong), double edged gun (liangtou chong), and big 100-bullet gun (da chong baizi). The Koreans and Vietnamese (sung and phao) also used the same terms to describe early firearms.

The oldest confirmed huochong, also the earliest cannon with a date of production, is a bronze bowl-mouth gun (wankou chong) bearing an inscription dating it to 1289 (see Xanadu Gun).

Chong was later used to describe European firearms such as Frankish cannons and muskets. In Fujian, the Frankish cannon was called "bie-wei chong" (turtle-tailed cannon). The matchlock musket was called "niaochong" or "niaozuichong" (bird-beak gun) before it was replaced by "niaoqiang" during the Qing dynasty. The term "niaoqiang" had been used since the late Ming dynasty, although very rarely. According to Song Yingxing, writing in 1647, the difference between a "niaoqiang" and "niaochong" was the length of their barrels and the range of their shots. A "niaochong" was about three chi in length and had a range of 100 paces. A "niaoqiang" was built the same as a "niaochong" except its barrel was twice as long, used twice as much gunpowder, and had a range of 200 paces.

== Gallery ==
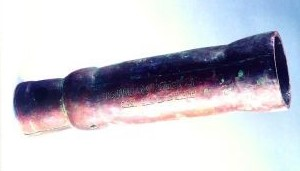
The Xanadu Gun, 1298, is the earliest dated cannon and an example of a bowl-mouth gun (wankou chong)

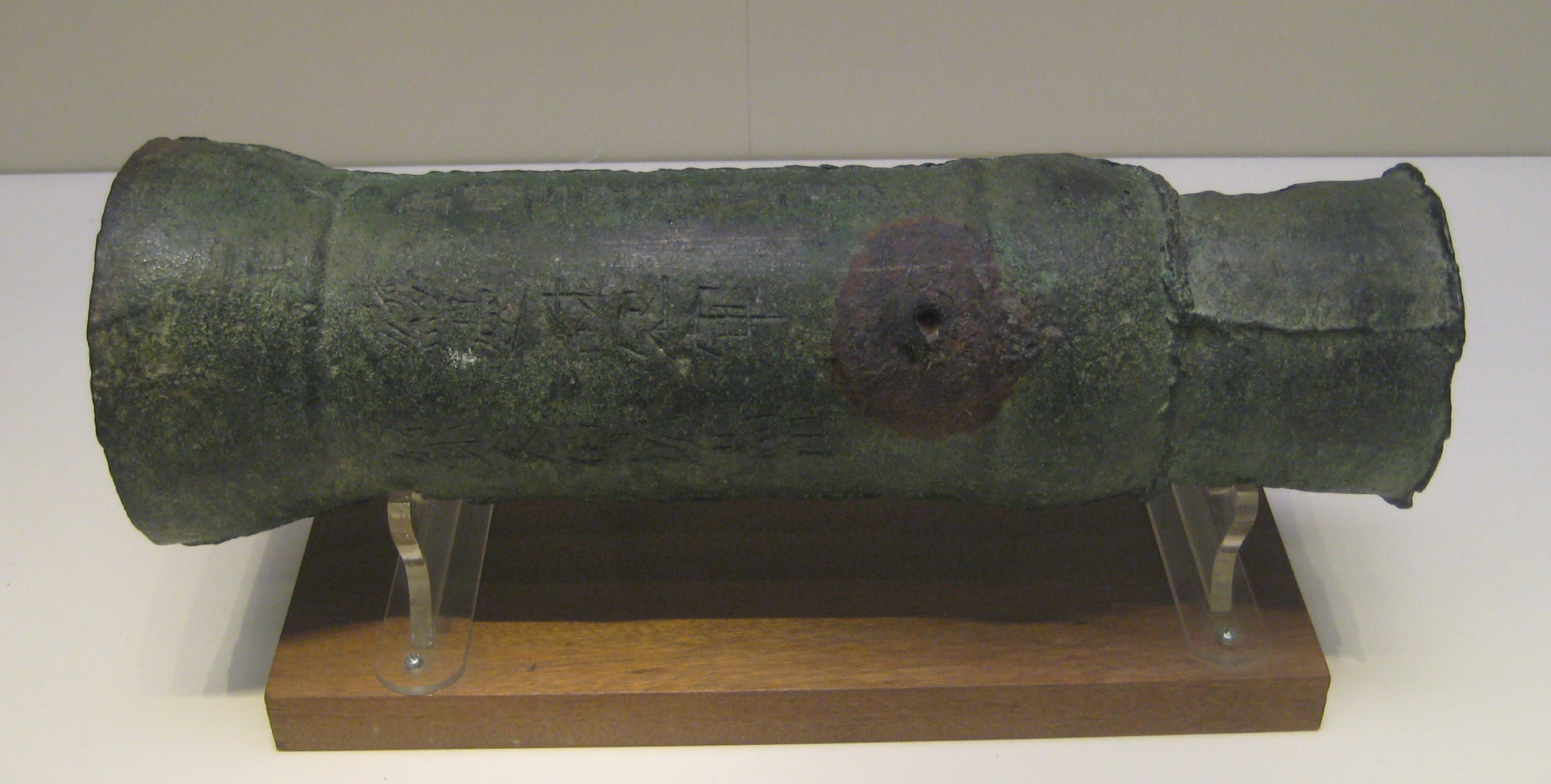
Bronze cannon with inscription dated the 3rd year of the Zhiyuan era (1332) of the Yuan Dynasty (1271–1368); it was discovered at the Yunju Temple of Fangshan District, Beijing in 1935. It is similar to Xanadu gun.

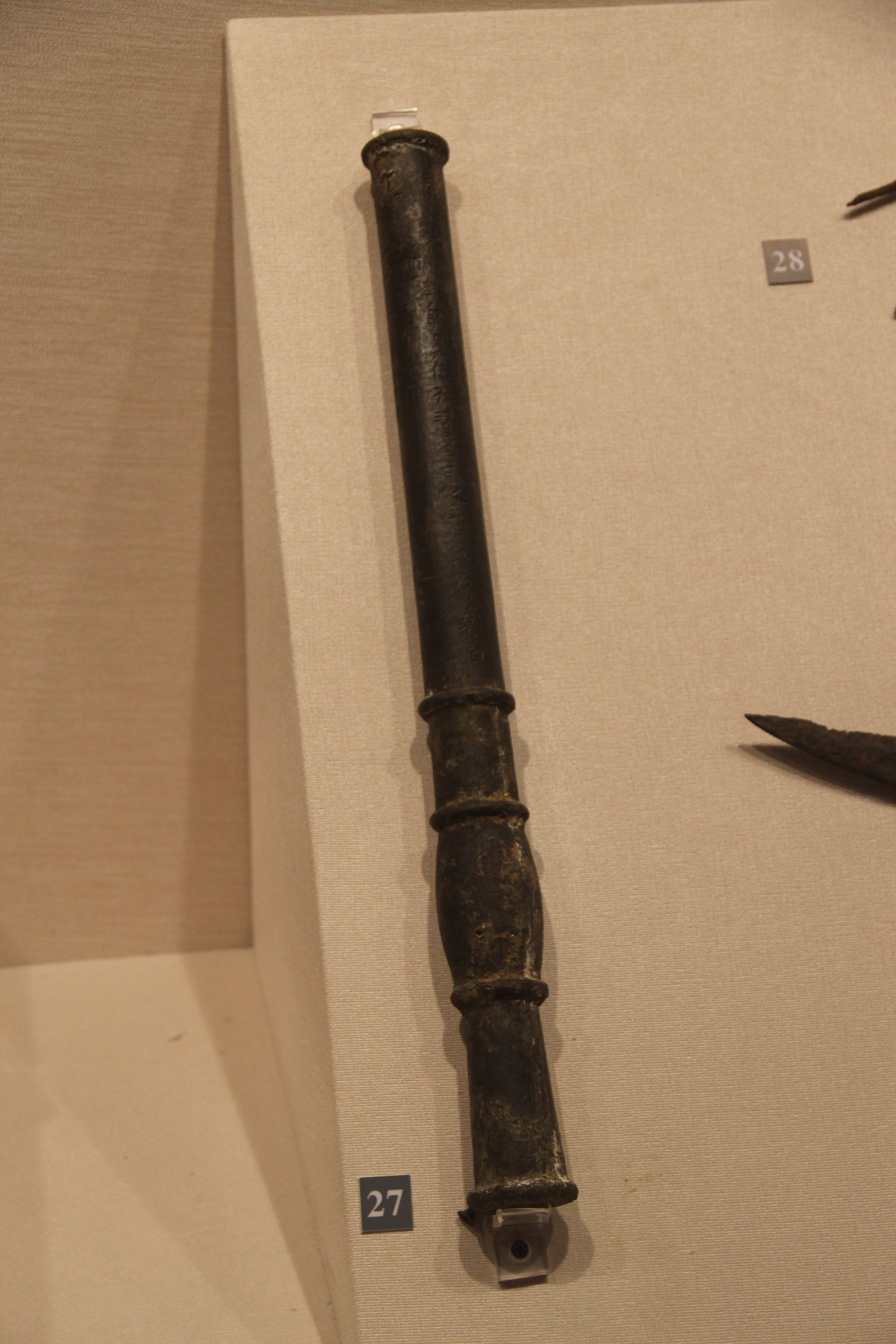
Ming Bronze Gun, 1377 AD, Hongwu Emperor's reign.

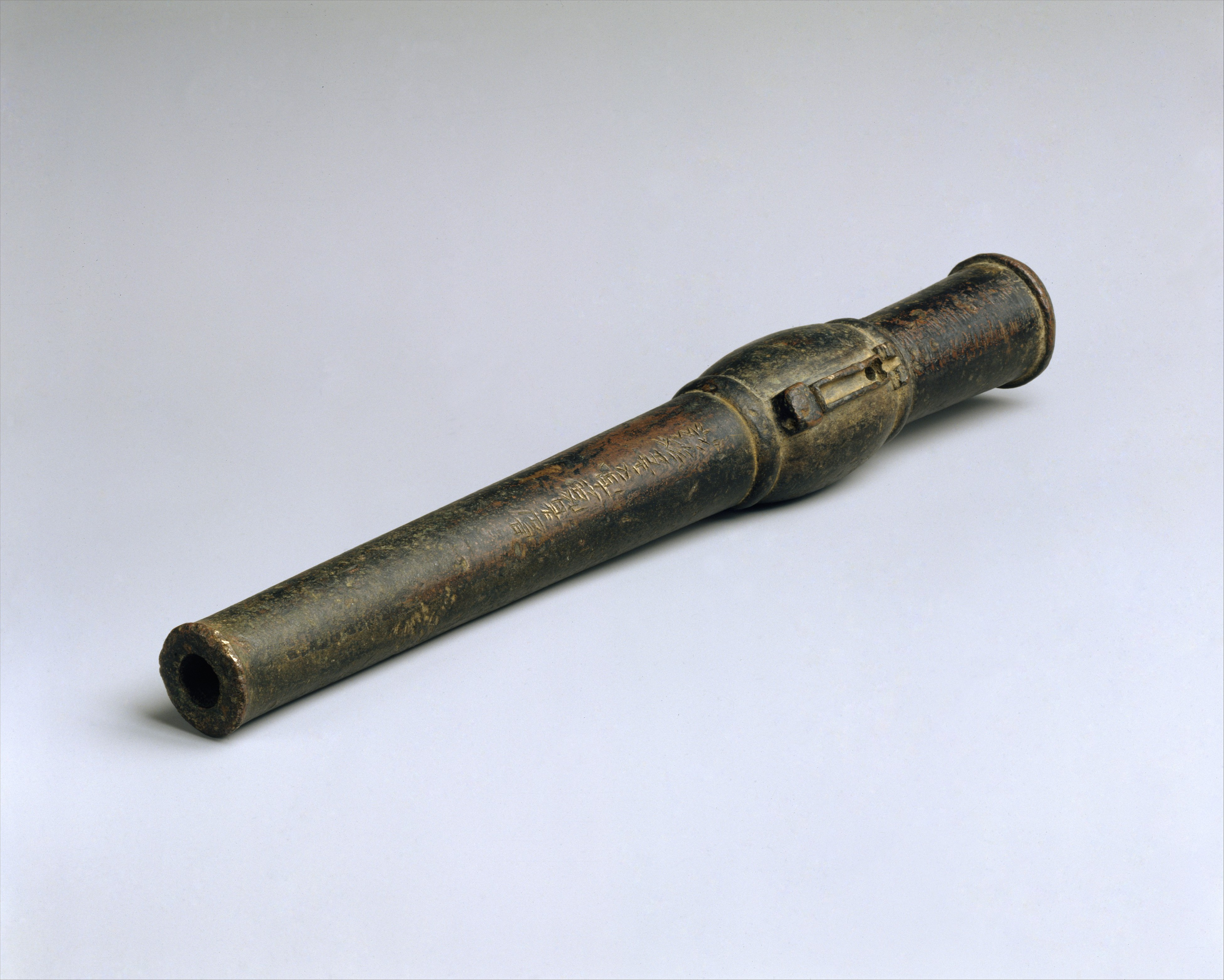
Chinese hand cannon (Chong), dated 1424. Length 35.7 cm, caliber 15 mm, weight 2.2736 kg.

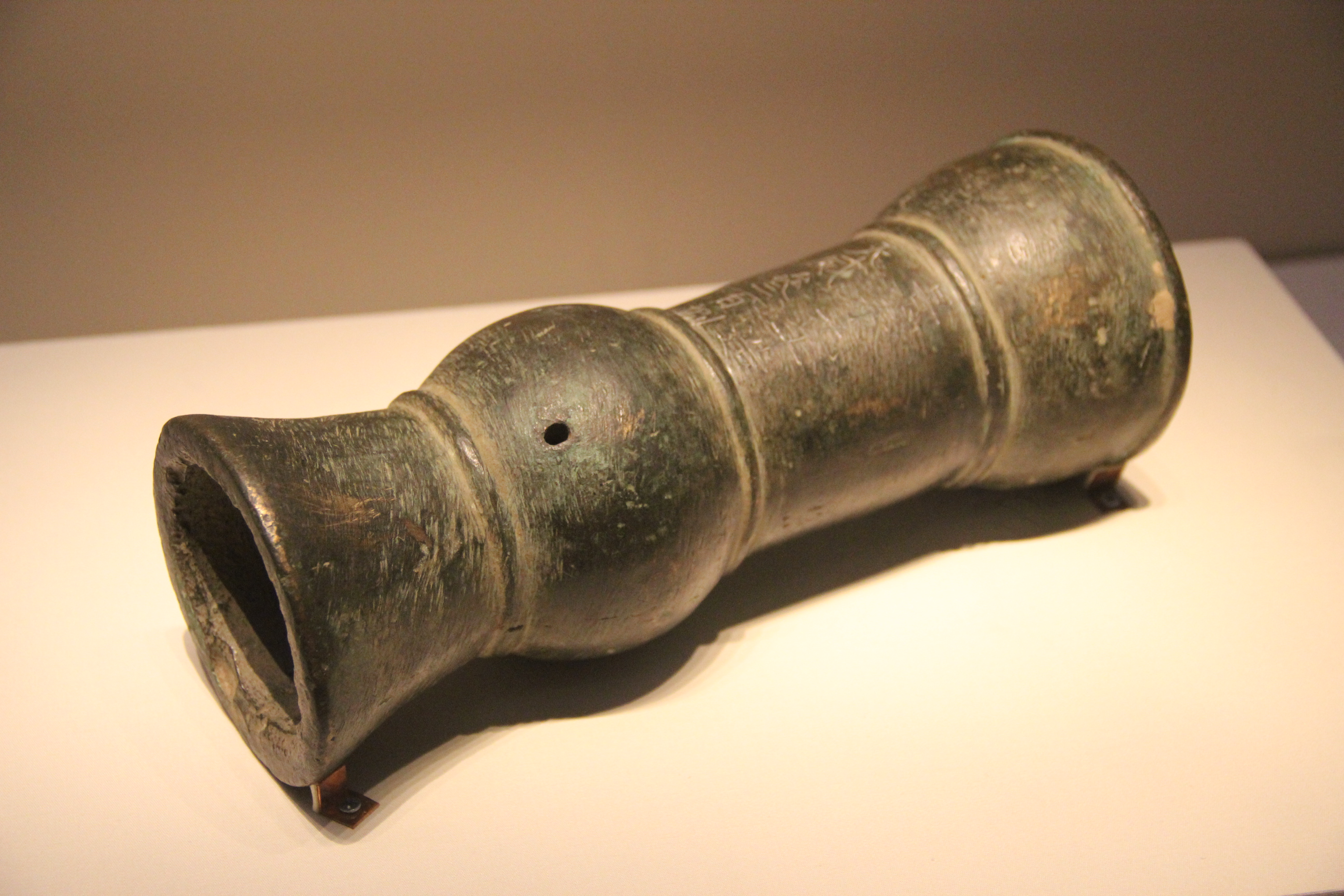
Ming copper cannon, 1450 AD.

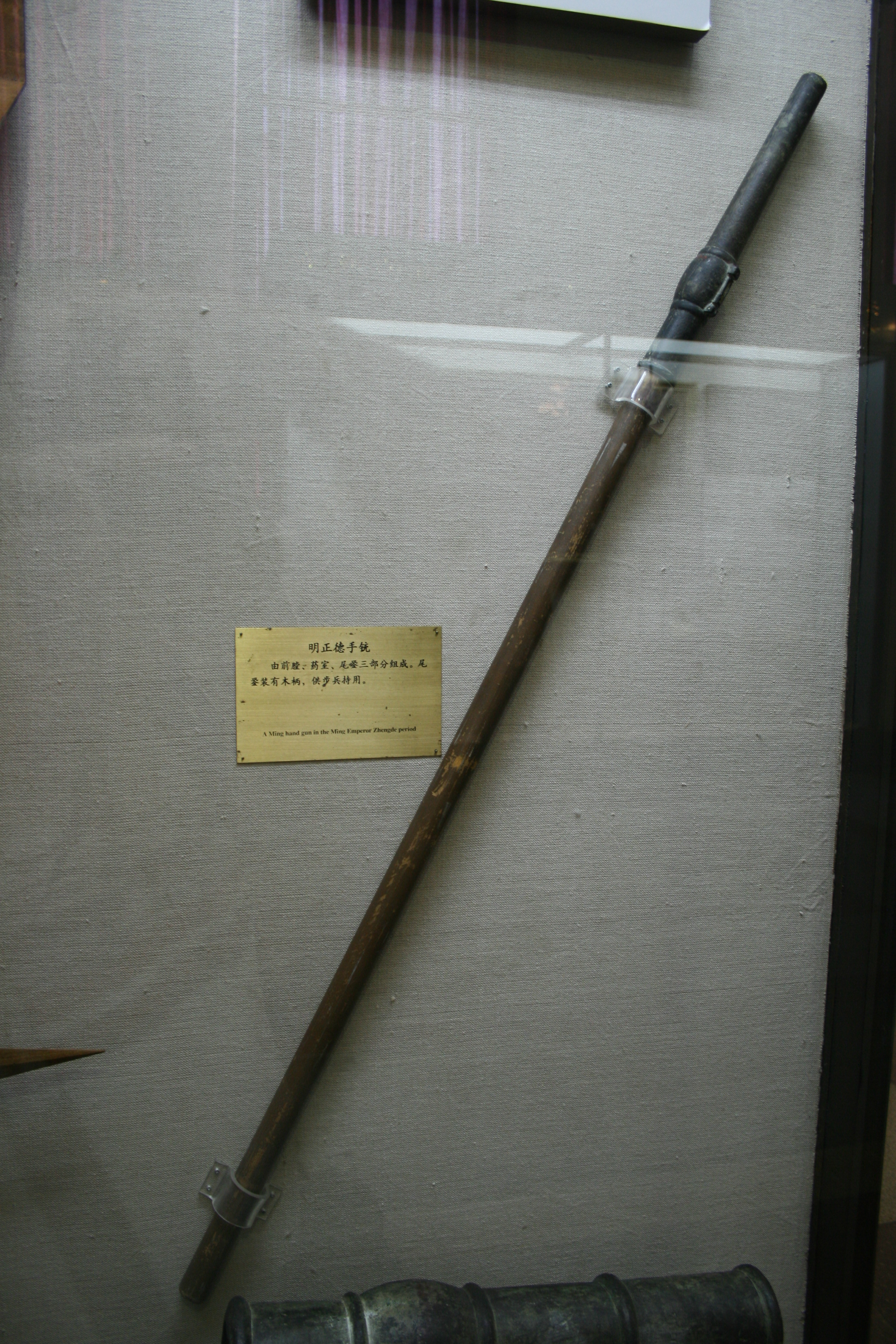
A socketed Ming dynasty hand cannon, 1505, from the Zhengde Emperor's reign.

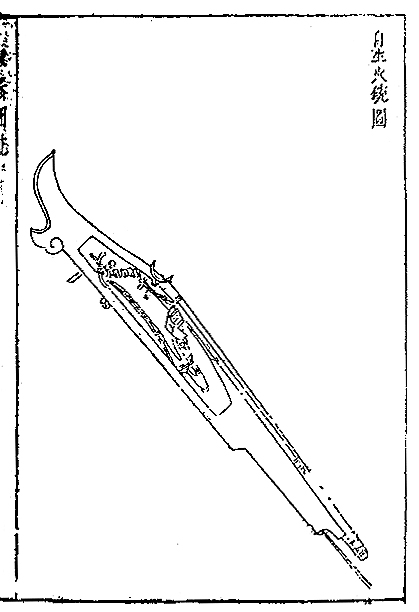
A flintlock musket described as a "self fire creating gun" (zi sheng huo chong tu).

== Bibliography ==
- Sun, Laichen (2018), Early Modern East Asia: War, Commerce, and Cultural Exchange, Taylor & Francis

== See also ==
- Hu dun pao, the term refers to trebuchet and cannon.
- Heilongjiang hand cannon, hand cannon, ca. 1287–1288.
- Xanadu gun, a bowl-mouthed hand cannon, 1298.
- Wuwei Bronze Cannon, late Western Xia (1214–1227).
- Gunpowder weapons in the Song dynasty
- Military of the Yuan dynasty
- Bedil tombak, Nusantaran hand cannon.
