= Military of the Yuan dynasty =

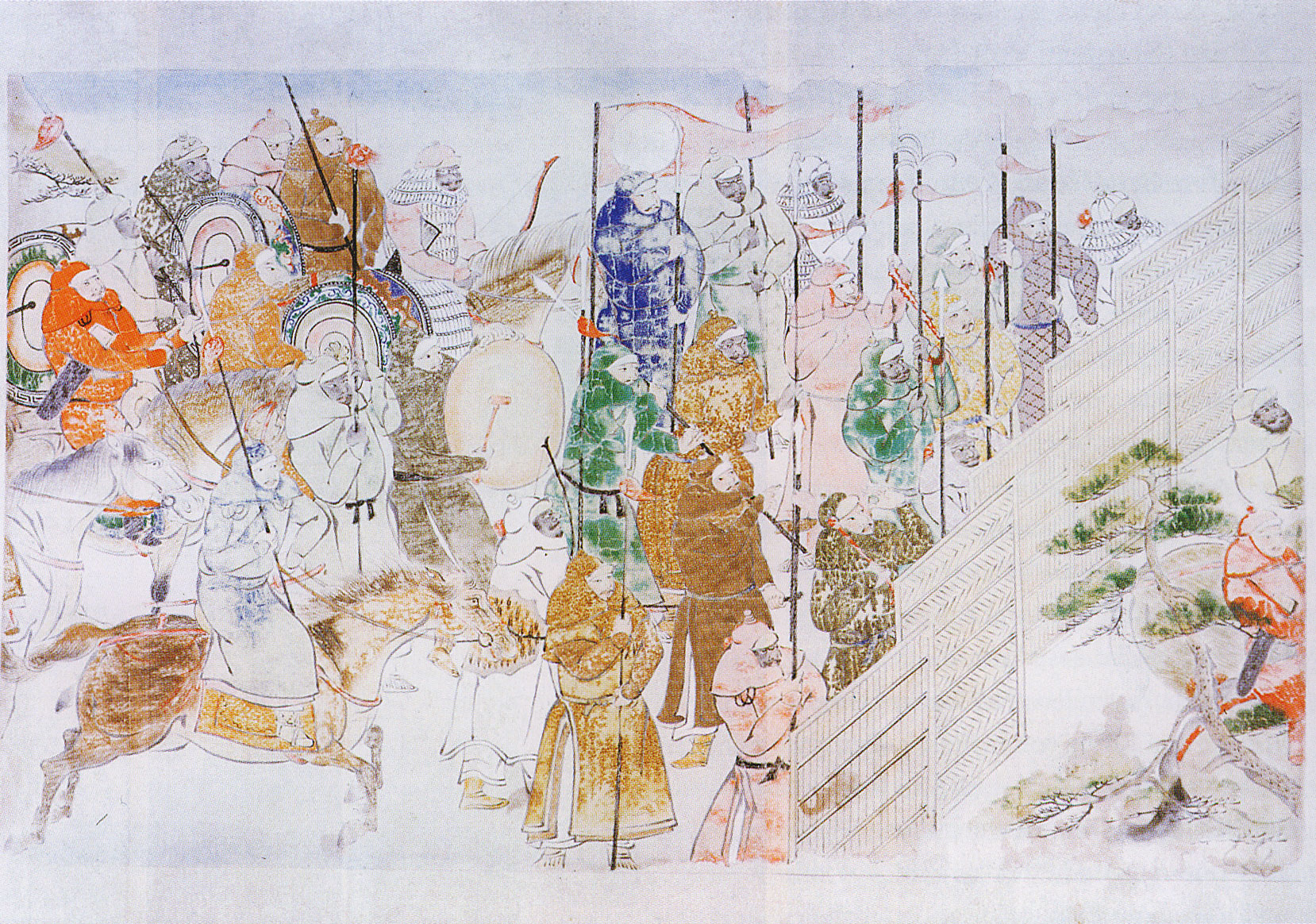
Japanese scroll depicting the Yuan forces during the Mongol Invasions of Japan

The military of the Yuan dynasty (1271–1368) were the armed forces of the Yuan dynasty, a fragment of the Mongol Empire that Kublai Khan established as a Mongol-led dynasty of China. The forces of the Yuan were based on the troops that were loyal to Kublai after the Division of the Mongol Empire in 1260. Initially, this force was a Tamma, a frontier army drawn from all Mongol tribes for conquest of China, which had no central organisation but was rather a loose collection of local warlords and Mongol princely armies. However, the army was gradually reformed by Kublai Khan into a more systematic force.

== Army Organisation ==
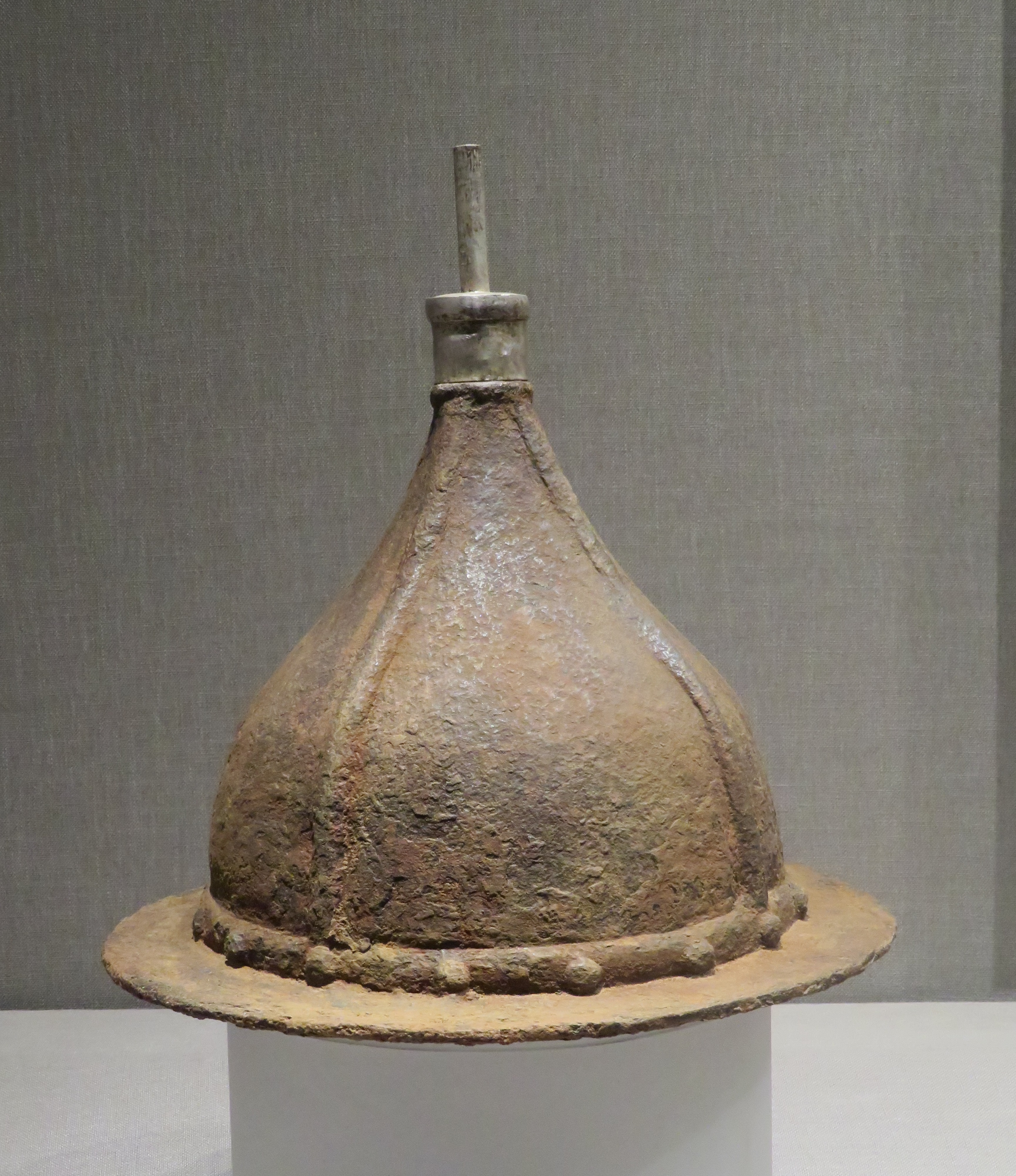
Yuan era helmet

Unlike previous Chinese dynasties that strictly separated military and civilian power, the Yuan administration of military and civil affairs tended to overlap, due to the traditional Mongol favour for the military over civilian affairs. This practice was harshly criticised by the Han Chinese scholar-officials at the time. Military officers were allowed to pass on their positions to their sons or grandsons after death, retirement or sometimes even after a promotion. Due to their Mongol background and unlike the previous Chinese dynasties, the Yuan granted feudal fief appanages with accompanying serfs throughout North China to military leaders, whether Mongol, Middle Eastern/Central Asian or Han. The conflict between these military nobles with the Imperial government was a persistent feature until the end of the dynasty.

Coming from a fully militarised culture, the Mongol rulers of the Yuan dynasty attempted to replicate elements of their own military in Chinese society. This was to be accomplished by establishing hereditary military households under the Bureau of Military Affairs that would provide troops for recruitment. Military households were grouped into four segments: Mongolian, Tammachi, Han, and the "Newly Adhered", each with different privileges including grants of stipends, food or tax exemptions. The Tammachi were Mongols and other steppe tribes on the southern edge of Mongolia. Han consisted of the North China forces that joined the Mongols before the 1250s while the "Newly Adhered" consisted of the South China forces that joined during the 1270s. Possibly following the "Mouke" practice of the Jin dynasty, households were also organised into a decimal system (groups of thousand, groups of ten thousand) to provide the necessary manpower and equipment for the military units. This household organisation was first introduced by Chinggis.

There were also military artisan households which provided hereditary services for the production of military equipment such as weapons, armour, siege engines. These were under the command of the military registers. Specialist forces included an artillery army and a crossbow army.

=== Guards ===
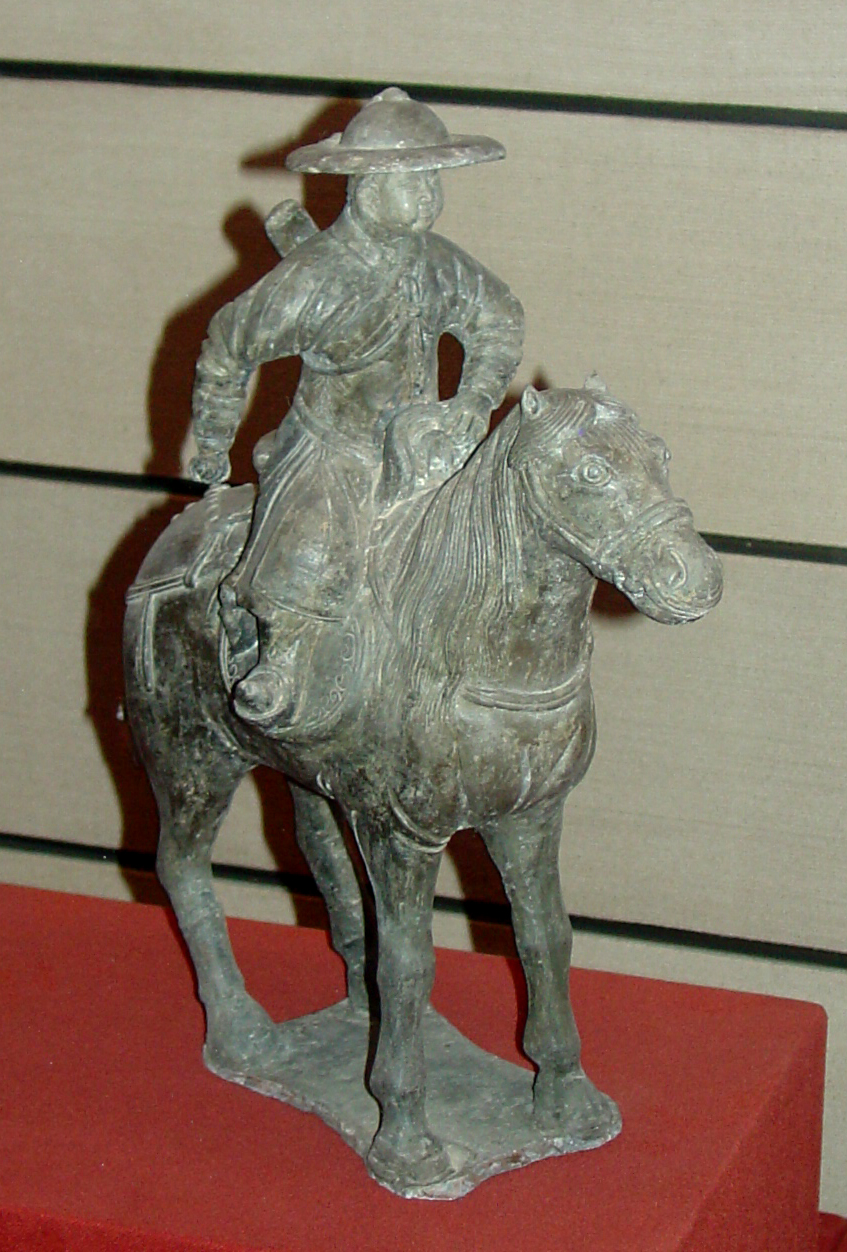
Yuan horseman

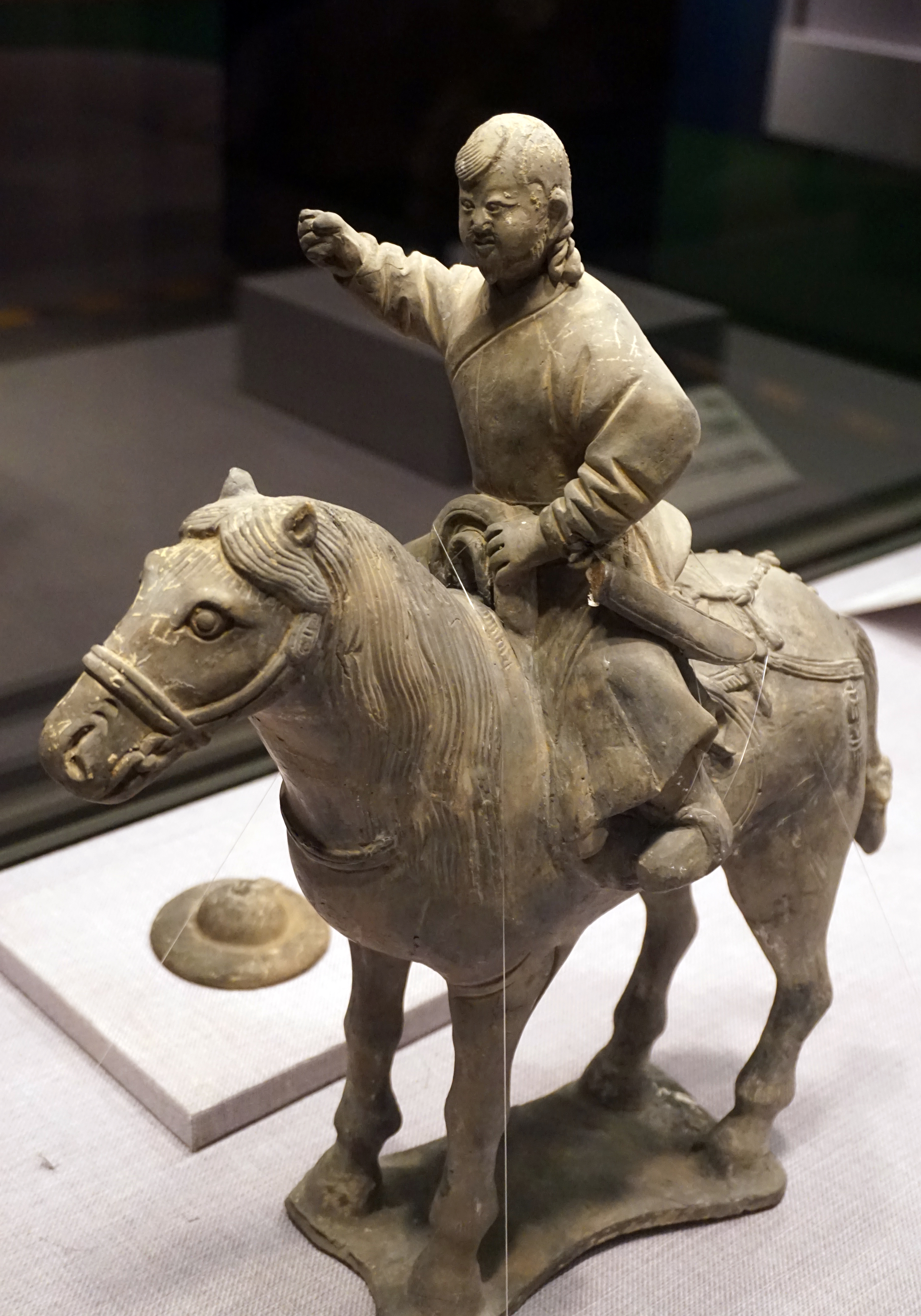
Yuan Mongol rider

Yuan Cavalry were mainly Mongols while infantry were mainly Chinese. For his own bodyguards Kublai retained the use of the traditional Mongol Keshig. The Keshig reported directly to the emperor.

Kublai created a new Imperial guard force, the suwei (宿衛), of which half were Han Chinese and the other half ethnically mixed. By the 1300s even the Keshig had become flooded with Han Chinese recruits. The suwei were initially 6,500 strong but by the end of the dynasty it had become 100,000 strong. They were divided into wei or guards, each recruited from a particular ethnicity. Most wei were Han Chinese, while a few were Mongols, Koreans, Tungusic peoples, and Central Asians/Middle Easterners including Kipchaks, Alans and even one unit of Russians. The Keshig was converted into an administrative organisation instead, as their military discipline declined by the late 13th century.

The guard forces were concentrated around the two capitals Daidu and Shangdu, and were responsible for the protection of the imperial family, the cultivation of military farms, construction and repairs in Daidu, and providing their own equipment, horses and feed — a heavy burden for guardsmen escorting the Khan to and from Shangdu. The control of guard garrisons became an important base of power for ambitious government ministers such as Bayan and Toqto'a to influence politics and act as kingmakers.

Yuan guard units also use crossbows.

=== Han Chinese and related forces ===
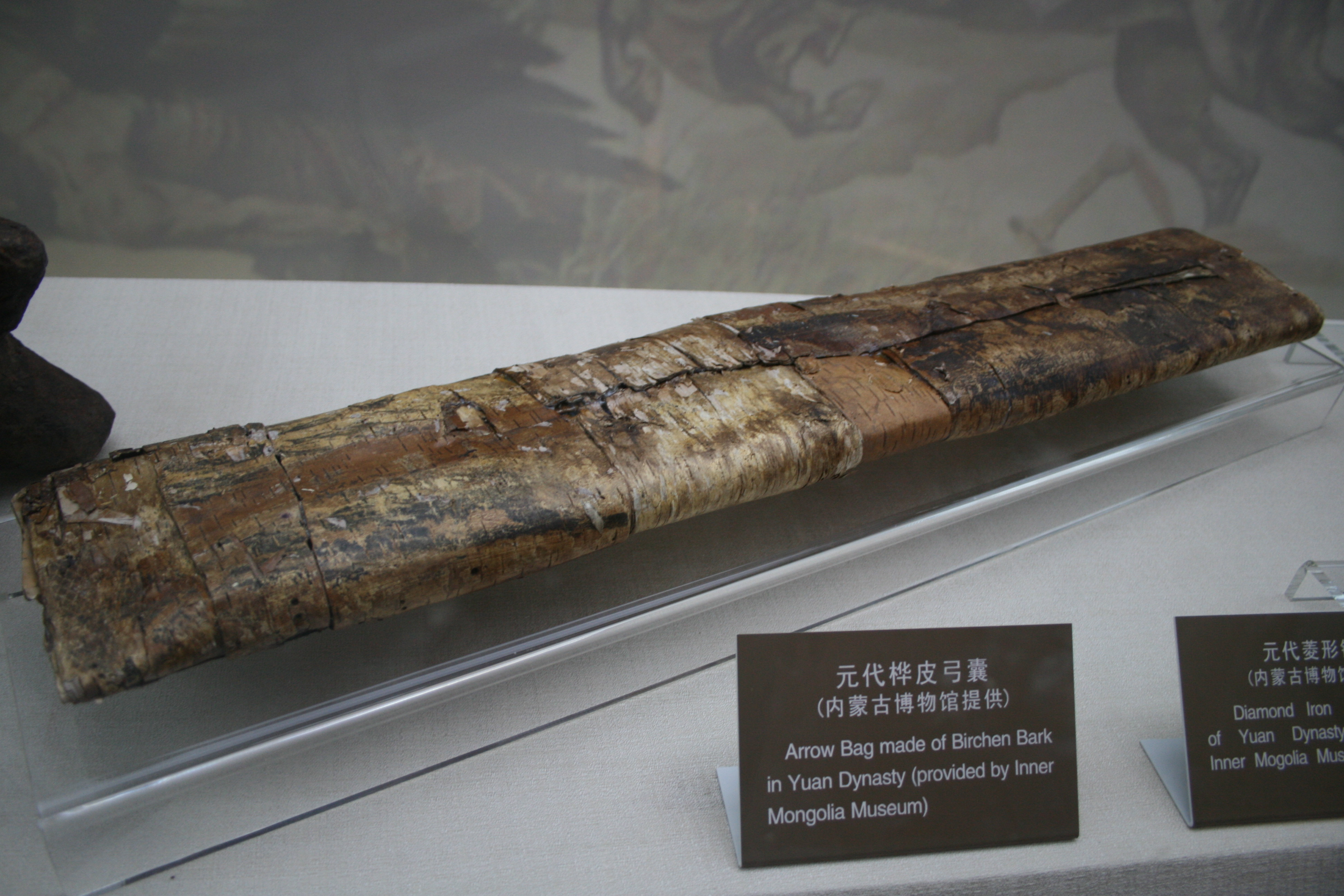
Yuan arrow bag

The Yuan dynasty created a "Han Army" (漢軍; hànjūn) out of defected Jin troops and army of defected Southern Song troops called the "Newly Adhered Army" (新附軍; xīnfùjūn). Apart from ethnic Han, Koreans, Khitans and Jurchens were also grouped under the Han Army.

Cherik soldiers were the earliest non-nomadic component in the Mongol military. The Mongols placed Jin defectors and Han Chinese conscripts into new armies formed by the Mongols as they invaded the Jin dynasty, and these forces played a critical role in the defeat of the Jin. For instance, Han Chinese defectors led by General Liu Bolin defended Tiancheng from the Jin in 1214 while Genghis Khan was returning north. In 1215, the Jin's Western Capital fell to Liu Bolin's army. The original Han cherik forces were created in 1216, with Liu Bolin as their leading officer. As Han troops continued defecting from the Jin to the Mongols the size of Han cherik forces swelled and they had to be partitioned between different units. In 1217-1218, Khitan commanders Chalaer, Yelu Tuhua and Uyar led three cherik armies in northern China under the Mongol viceroy Muqali in addition to his tamma armies. Han soldiers made up the majority of the Khitan Yelu Tuhua's army, while Juyin soldiers (Khitans, Tanguts, Ongguds and other vassal tribes) from Zhongdu made up Chalaer's army and Khitans made up Uyar's army. By Muqali's death in 1223, Han troops greatly outnumbered Mongol soldiers under his command.

In 1232, Ogedei Khan granted permission for field commanders to organize Han decimal-based units from Chinese warlord forces. By 1241, the number of military households constituted 1 out of 7 households in North China, and formed an important element of the Mongol army. While most were peasant militia, some were capable of serving as cavalry forces equal to the Mongols, having been drawn from experienced frontier veterans or former Jin dynasty cavalrymen. Prior to the reforms of 1235, the Mongols named the initial Han defectors, led by individual officers who had defected, as the "Black Army" (heijun 黑軍). Under the arrangement of Ogedei Khan, the Han officer Shi Tianze, Han officer Liu Ni and the Khitan officer Xiao Chala, all three of whom had defected to the Mongols from the Jin army, were given command of three tumed consisting of a total of 36 units, each comprising 1,000 Han Chinese soldiers. By 1234, there were at least three additional tumed under the command of Chang Jung, Yen Shi and Chung Jou. Another new infantry-based "New Army" (xinjun 新軍) was created after the Mongols conscripted 95,000 additional Han soldiers after the 1236 and 1241 censuses, taken after the fall of the Jin. The Mongols deployed Han cherik forces to fight against Li Tan's revolt in 1262 — who was himself a respected commander under Mongke Khan. The New Army and Black Army had hereditary officer posts like the Mongol army itself, but Kublai became distrustful of Han generals after Li Tan's rebellion and limited the number of command positions held by each Han family. Before Kublai, the early Mongol Empire had been accepting of autonomous Chinese warlord forces as a key element in the Mongol armies, but during the Yuan dynasty, due to considerable Mongol fears of Chinese insurrection, these hereditary commanders were increasingly restricted.

After the Mongols absorbed the Newly Adhered Army into the Yuan military (albeit with different status and privileges than the earlier-formed Hanjun), the Newly Adhered forces were placed under the command of Mongol or Central Asian officers and sent to fight Kublai's various campaigns throughout Asia. The necessary troop numbers for Kublai Khan's campaigns could only be filled by relying on these vast numbers of Southern Chinese soldiers that submitted in the 1270s, especially for naval expeditions which were composed entirely of Han Chinese and Koreans. Southern Song Chinese troops who defected to the Mongols were granted Korean women as wives, whom the Mongols had earlier taken during their invasion of Korea as war booty. Kublai also granted oxen, clothing and land to the many Song Chinese troops who defected to the Mongols. As prizes for battlefield victories, the Yuan had lands sectioned off as appanages and handed to Chinese military officers who had defected to the Mongol side. The Yuan awarded juntun, a type of military farmland, to Song Chinese soldiers who defected to the Mongols.

South China's army garrisons reported to individual provincial governments instead of the Bureau of Military Affairs in the capital, to prevent the concentration of authority in any one commander. Local militia generally wore uniforms of yellow or dark blue-green colour. Due to the low status of military professions in China, and exploitation by corrupt administrators, desertion was a massive problem after the death of Kublai Khan.

=== Mongol, other steppe or Central Asian forces ===
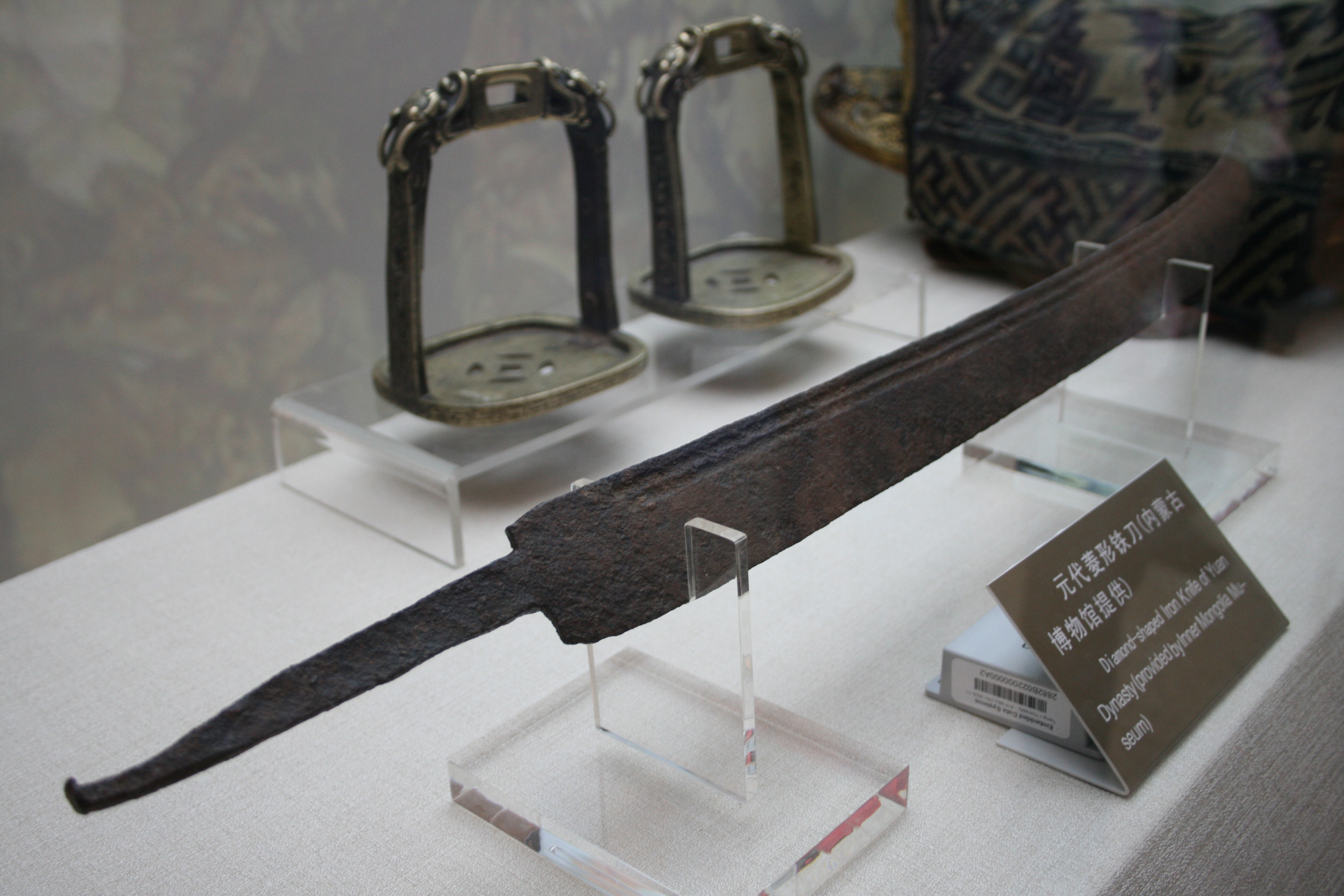
Yuan iron sword and stirrups

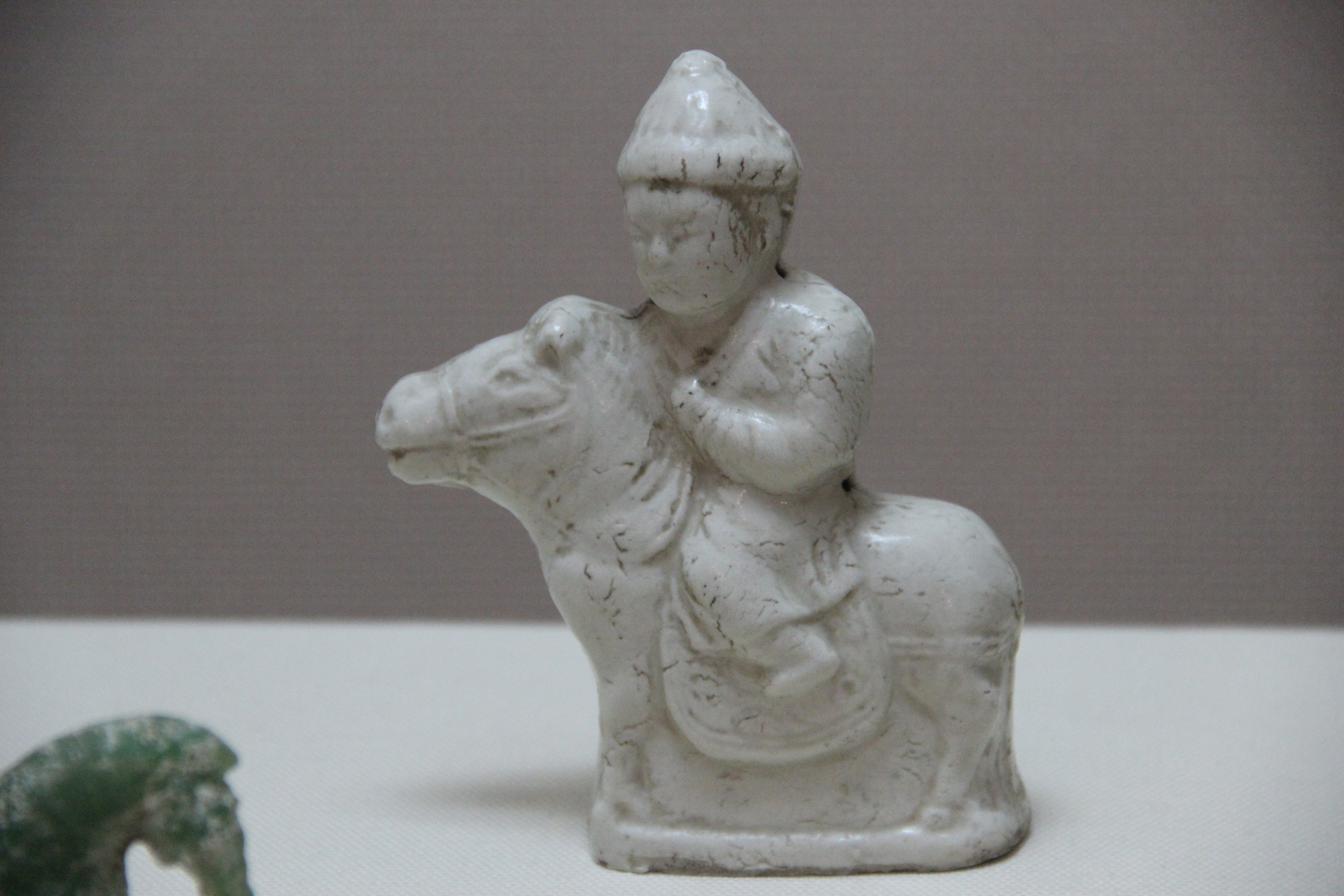
Yuan era horseman figurine

The Mongolian army was under direct command of the Emperor, while Tammachi were under semi-independent Mongol lords. Five Tammachi clans, the touxia, seem to have served the Yuan as allied forces under their own chiefs. Mongol forces were divided into toumans of 10,000 under a wanhu, divided into minghans of 1,000 under a qianhu, but in practice toumans ranged from 3,000 to 7,000 in strength.

The Tammachi were organised into Tamma, meaning to govern or control, which were meant to be rapid deployment forces stationed in nomadic steppeland but could be quickly mobilised to fight emerging threats. The Tamma were established in Inner Mongolia in 1217/1218 under their first commander Muqali. The Tamma also had attached units of advance scouts known as alginchi, of which there were initially 1,000 such units, stationed in the newly conquered North China. With the establishment of the Chinese-style Yuan government, the main Tamma became less important while the alginchi units continued to be a part of the occupation forces. Alginchi were still maintained as the Yuan's crucial mobile cavalry force while the rest of the Mongol forces deep in China were increasingly cut off from their horse supply. Despite government seizure of horses, horse supplies were insufficient to meet the demand for horses and even Mongols were sometimes compelled to serve as infantrymen. The Tammachi also included Muslim units from Central Asia, especially the Uyghurs who were given special privileges for being among the earliest to join Genghis Khan. Many of these were stationed in Yunnan to suppress local resistance and campaign against Burma and Vietnam, leading to a Muslim influx there.

Mongols, now living in China, had immense difficulty meeting their military service obligations, as they needed to make a living as farmers and had no pastures to rear horses, having to purchase them at their own expense. By the 1300s many Mongol men could not even foot the cost for travel to enlist in the army. The Yuan army also contained a force known as the Tongshi Jun, which were Mongols who had fought against the Mongols for the Song dynasty.

=== South China tribal forces ===
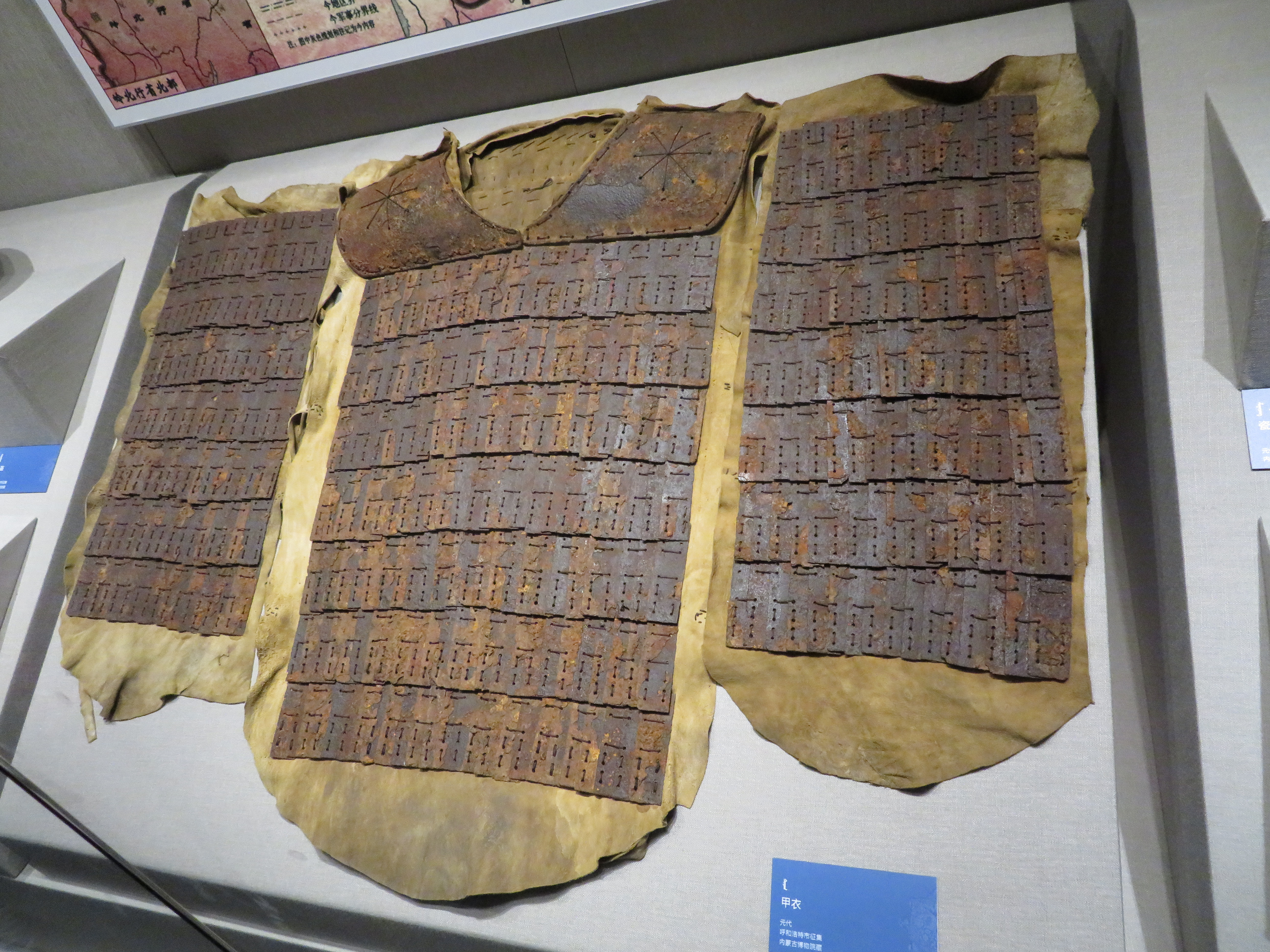
Yuan period suit of armour

The Mongols made heavy use of indigenous ethnic minority soldiers in southern China in lieu of Mongol soldiers. The Kingdom of Dali's indigenous Cuan-Bo army led by the Duan royal family were the majority of the forces in the Mongol Yuan army in the campaigns against the Song dynasty along the Yangtze river. During a Mongol attack against the Song, there were only 3,000 Mongol cavalry at one point under the Mongol commander Uriyangkhadai, the majority of his army being native Cuan-Bo with Duan officers. The Duan forces were instrumental in the Yuan's campaigns against Vietnam and suppressing uprisings in Yunnan. This tradition of Duan royals' service to the Yuan was noted by the succeeding Ming dynasty. The Duan family attempted to use their loyal service record to persuade the Ming to accept them as vassals when the Yuan collapsed. Other specialist troops were a Miao Army (which was used to garrison Suzhou and Hangzhou in the 1350s), and other tribal forces from Southern China.

== Weapons ==
=== Gunpowder weapons ===
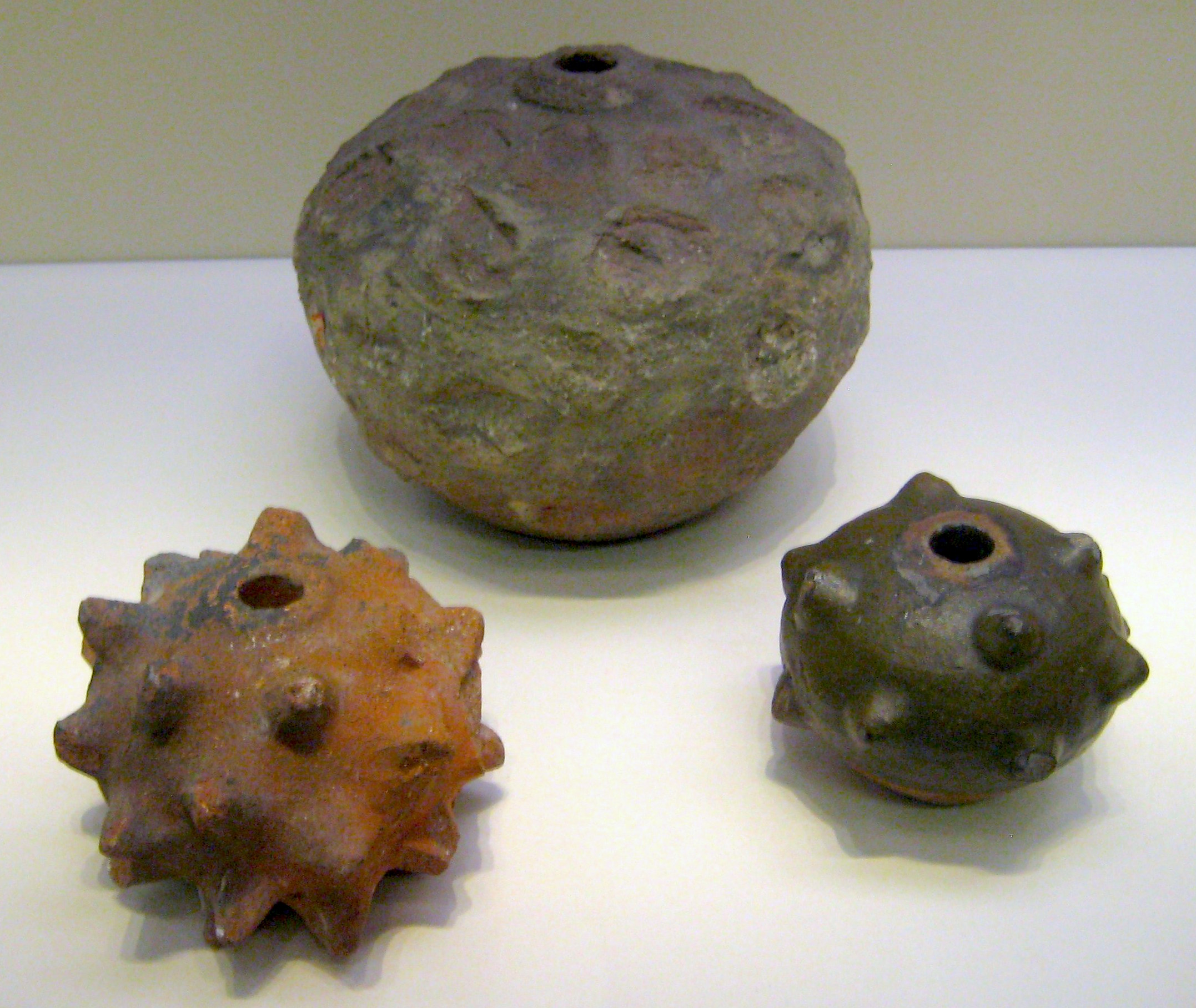
Exploding caltrops meant to be filled with gunpowder, 13th to 14th century

The Yuan dynasty made use of gunpowder weapons such as fire arrows, bombs, and cannons. It also fought with gunpowder armed states such as the Song dynasty during the Siege of Xiangyang. Blocking the Mongols' passage south of the Yangtze were the twin fortress cities of Xiangyang and Fancheng. What resulted was one of the longest sieges the world had ever known, lasting from 1268 to 1273. For the first three years the Song defenders had been able to receive supplies and reinforcements by water, but in 1271 the Mongols set up a full blockade with a formidable navy of their own, isolating the two cities. This did not prevent the Song from running the supply route anyway; two men surnamed Zhang did exactly that. The Two Zhangs commanded a hundred paddle wheel boats, travelling by night under the light of lantern fire, but were discovered early on by a Mongol commander. When the Song fleet arrived near the cities, they found the Mongol fleet to have spread themselves out along the entire width of the Yangtze with "vessels spread out, filling the entire surface of the river, and there was no gap for them to enter." Another defensive measure the Mongols had taken was the construction of a chain, which stretched across the water. The two fleets engaged in combat and the Song opened fire with fire-lances, fire-bombs, and crossbows. A large number of men died trying to cut through chains, pull up stakes, and hurl bombs, while Song marines fought hand to hand using large axes, and according to the Mongol record, "on their ships they were up to the ankles in blood." With the rise of dawn, the Song vessels made it to the city walls and the citizens "leapt up a hundred times in joy." In 1273 the Mongols enlisted the expertise of two Muslim engineers, one from Persia and one from Syria, who helped in the construction of counterweight trebuchets. These new siege weapons had the capability of throwing larger missiles further than the previous traction trebuchets. One account records, "when the machinery went off the noise shook heaven and earth; every thing that [the missile] hit was broken and destroyed." The fortress city of Xiangyang fell in 1273.

The next major battle to feature gunpowder weapons was during a campaign led by the Mongol general Bayan, who commanded an army of around two hundred thousand, consisting of mostly Chinese soldiers. It was probably the largest army the Mongols had ever utilized. Such an army was still unable to successfully storm Song city walls, as seen in the 1274 Siege of Shayang. Thus Bayan waited for the wind to change to a northerly course before ordering his artillerists to begin bombarding the city with molten metal bombs, which caused such a fire that "the buildings were burned up and the smoke and flames rose up to heaven." Shayang was captured and its inhabitants massacred.

Gunpowder bombs were used again in the 1275 Siege of Changzhou in the latter stages of the Mongol-Song Wars. Upon arriving at the city, Bayan gave the inhabitants an ultimatum: "if you ... resist us ... we shall drain your carcasses of blood and use them for pillows." The threat was not heeded and the city resisted anyway, so the Mongol army bombarded them with fire bombs before storming the walls, after which followed an immense slaughter claiming the lives of a quarter million. The war lasted for only another four years during which some remnants of the Song held up last desperate defenses. In 1277, 250 defenders under Lou Qianxia conducted a suicide bombing and set off a huge iron bomb when it became clear defeat was imminent. Of this, the History of Song writes, "the noise was like a tremendous thunderclap, shaking the walls and ground, and the smoke filled up the heavens outside. Many of the troops [outside] were startled to death. When the fire was extinguished they went in to see. There were just ashes, not a trace left." The Mongol-Song Wars saw the deployment of all the gunpowder weapons available to both sides at the time, mostly gunpowder arrows, bombs, and lances, although it also saw the birth of the gun which later overshadowed the other developments.

In 1280, a large store of gunpowder at Weiyang in Yangzhou accidentally caught fire, producing such a massive explosion that a team of inspectors at the site a week later deduced that some 100 guards had been killed instantly, with wooden beams and pillars blown sky high and landing at a distance of over 10 li (~2 mi. or ~3 km) away from the explosion, creating a crater more than ten feet deep. One resident described the noise of the explosion as if it "was like a volcano erupting, a tsunami crashing. The entire population was terrified." According to surviving reports, the incident was caused by inexperienced gunpowder makers hired to replace the previous ones, and had been careless while grinding sulfur. A spark caused by the grinding process came into contact with some fire lances which immediately started spewing flames and jetting around "like frightened snakes." The gunpowder makers did nothing as they found the sight highly amusing, that is until one fire lance burst into a cache of bombs, causing the entire complex to explode. The validity of this report is somewhat questionable, assuming everyone within the immediate vicinity was killed.

The disaster of the trebuchet bomb arsenal at Weiyang was still more terrible. Formerly the artisan positions were all held by southerners (i.e. the Chinese). But they engaged in peculation, so they had to be dismissed, and all their jobs were given to northerners (probably Mongols, or Chinese who had served them). Unfortunately, these men understood nothing of the handling of chemical substances. Suddenly, one day, while sulphur was being ground fine, it burst into flame, then the (stored) fire-lances caught fire, and flashed hither and thither like frightened snakes. (At first) the workers thought it was funny, laughing and joking, but after a short time the fire got into the bomb store, and then there was a noise like a volcanic eruption and the howling of a storm at sea. The whole city was terrified, thinking that an army was approaching, and panic soon spread among the people, who could not tell whether it was near or far away. Even at a distance of a hundred li tiles shook and houses trembled. People gave alarms of fire but the troops were held strictly to discipline. The disturbance lasted a whole day and night. After order had been restored an inspection was made, and it was found that a hundred men of the guards had been blown to bits, beams and pillars had been deft asunder or carried away by the force of the explosion to a distance over ten li. The smooth ground was scooped into craters and trenches more than ten feet deep. Above two hundred families living in the neighbourhood were victims of this unexpected disaster. This was indeed an unusual occurrence.

— Guixin Zazhi

==== Hand cannon ====
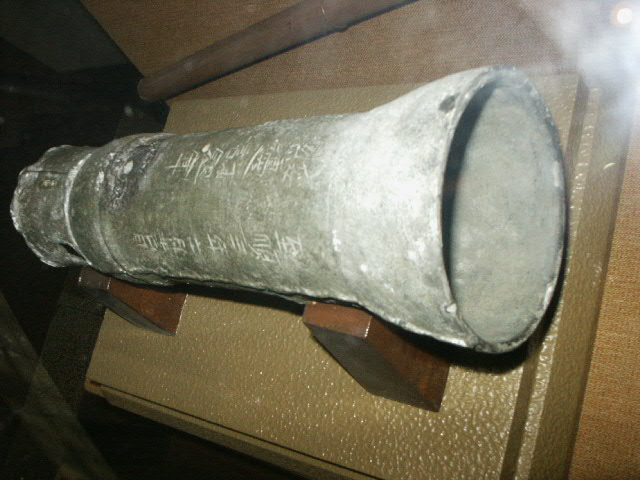
Replica of a Yuan cannon dated 1332

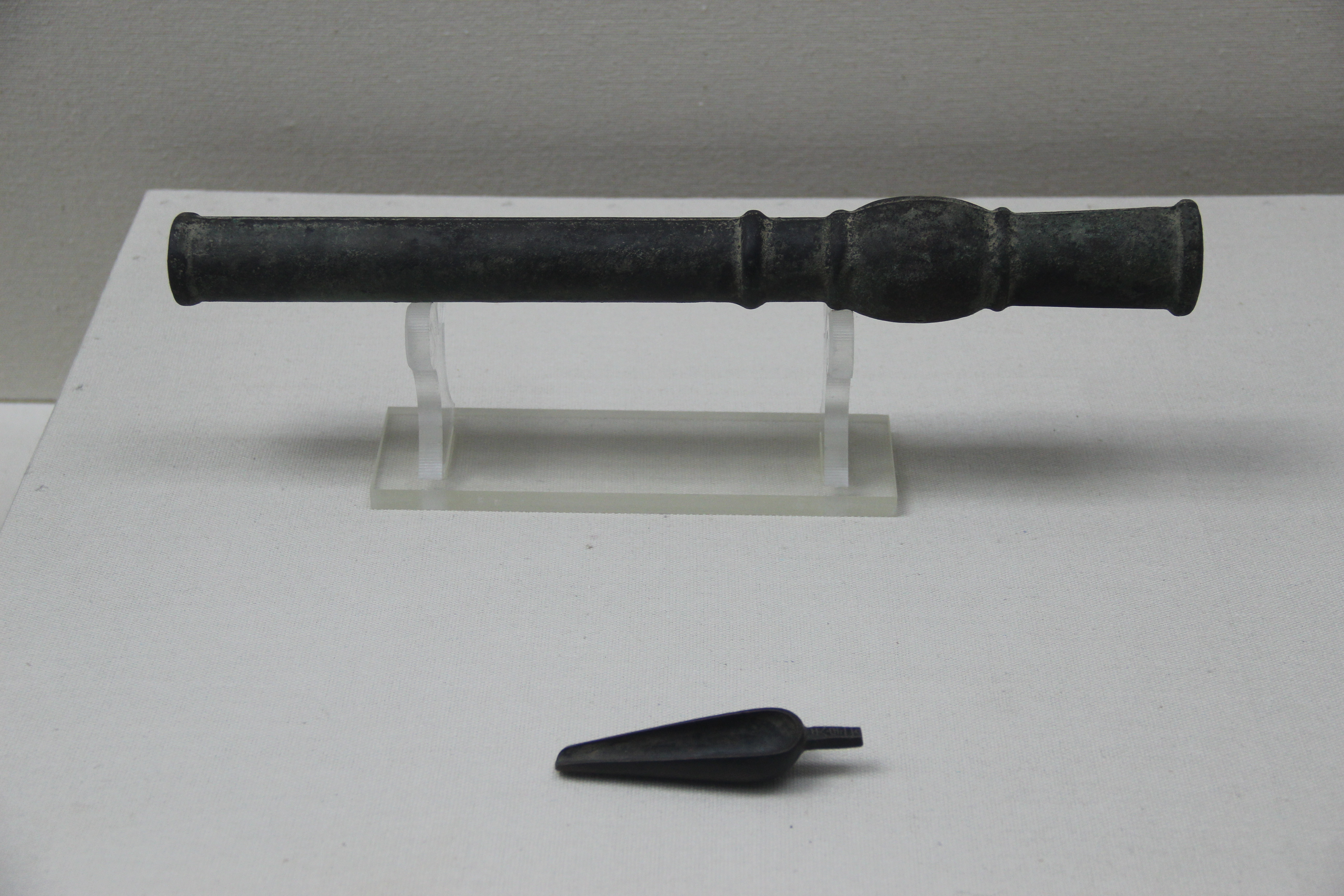
Hand cannon, Yuan dynasty

Traditionally the first appearance of the hand cannon is dated to the late 13th century, just after the Mongol conquest of the Song dynasty. However a sculpture depicting a figure carrying a gourd shaped hand cannon was discovered among the Dazu Rock Carvings in 1985 by Robin D. S. Yates. The sculptures were completed roughly 250 km northwest of Chongqing by 1128, after the fall of Kaifeng to the Jin dynasty. If the dating is correct this would push back the appearance of the cannon in China by a hundred years more than previously thought. The bulbous nature of the cannon is congruous with the earliest hand cannons discovered in China and Europe.

Archaeological samples of the gun, specifically the hand cannon (huochong), have been dated starting from the 13th century. The oldest extant gun whose dating is unequivocal is the Xanadu Gun, so called because it was discovered in the ruins of Xanadu, the Mongol summer palace in Inner Mongolia. The Xanadu Gun is 34.7 cm in length and weighs 6.2 kg. Its dating is based on archaeological context and a straightforward inscription whose era name and year corresponds with the Gregorian Calendar at 1298. Not only does the inscription contain the era name and date, it also includes a serial number and manufacturing information which suggests that gun production had already become systematized, or at least become a somewhat standardized affair by the time of its fabrication. The design of the gun includes axial holes in its rear which some speculate could have been used in a mounting mechanism. Like most early guns with the possible exception of the Western Xia gun, it is small, weighing just over six kilograms and thirty-five centimeters in length. Although the Xanadu Gun is the most precisely dated gun from the 13th century, other extant samples with approximate dating likely predate it.

One candidate is the Heilongjiang hand cannon, discovered in 1970, and named after the province of its discovery, Heilongjiang, in northeastern China. It is small and light like the Xanadu gun, weighing only 3.5 kilograms, 34 cm (Needham says 35 cm), and a bore of approximately 2.5 cm. Based on contextual evidence, historians believe it was used by Yuan forces against a rebellion by Mongol prince Nayan in 1287. The History of Yuan states that a Jurchen commander known as Li Ting led troops armed with hand cannons into battle against Nayan. It reports that the cannons of Li Ting's soldiers "caused great damage," but also created "such confusion that the enemy soldiers attacked and killed each other." The hand cannons were used again in the beginning of 1288. Li Ting's "gun-soldiers" or chongzu (銃卒) were able to carry the hand cannons "on their backs". The passage on the 1288 battle is also the first to coin the name chong (銃) with the metal radical jin (金) for metal-barrel firearms. Chong was used instead of the earlier and more ambiguous term huo tong (fire tube; 火筒), which may refer to the tubes of fire lances, proto-cannons, or signal flares.

Li Ting chose gun-soldiers (chong zu), concealing those who bore the huo pao on their backs; then by night he crossed the river, moved upstream, and fired off (the weapons). This threw all the enemy's horses and men into great confusion ... and he gained a great victory.

— History of Yuan

Even older, the Ningxia gun was found in Ningxia Hui Autonomous Region by collector Meng Jianmin (孟建民). This Yuan dynasty firearm is 34.6 cm long, the muzzle 2.6 cm in diameter, and weighs 1.55 kilograms. The firearm contains a transcription reading, "Made by bronzesmith Li Liujing in the year Zhiyuan 8 (直元), ningzi number 2565" (銅匠作頭李六徑，直元捌年造，寧字二仟伍百陸拾伍號). Similar to the Xanadu Gun, it bears a serial number 2565, which suggests it may have been part of a series of guns manufactured. While the era name and date corresponds with the Gregorian Calendar at 1271 CE, putting it earlier than both the Heilongjiang Hand Gun as well as the Xanadu Gun, but one of the characters used in the era name is irregular, causing some doubt among scholars on the exact date of production.

Another specimen, the Wuwei Bronze Cannon, was discovered in 1980 and may possibly be the oldest as well as largest cannon of the 13th century: a 100 centimeter 108 kilogram bronze cannon discovered in a cellar in Wuwei, Gansu Province containing no inscription, but has been dated by historians to the late Western Xia period between 1214 and 1227. The gun contained an iron ball about nine centimeters in diameter, which is smaller than the muzzle diameter at twelve centimeters, and 0.1 kilograms of gunpowder in it when discovered, meaning that the projectile might have been another co-viative. Ben Sinvany and Dang Shoushan believe that the ball used to be much larger prior to its highly corroded state at the time of discovery. While large in size, the weapon is noticeably more primitive than later Yuan dynasty guns, and is unevenly cast. A similar weapon was discovered not far from the discovery site in 1997, but much smaller in size at only 1.5 kg. Chen Bingying disputes this however, and argues there were no guns before 1259, while Dang Shoushan believes the Western Xia guns point to the appearance of guns by 1220, and Stephen Haw goes even further by stating that guns were developed as early as 1200. Sinologist Joseph Needham and renaissance siege expert Thomas Arnold provide a more conservative estimate of around 1280 for the appearance of the "true" cannon. Whether or not any of these are correct, it seems likely that the gun was born sometime during the 13th century.

A poem written in 1341 by Zhang Xian describes shells being fired from a cannon:

The black dragon lobbed over an egg-shaped thing
Fully the size of a peck measure it was,
And it burst, and a dragon flew out with peals of thunder rolling.
In the air it was like a blazing and flashing fire.
The first bang was like the dividing of chaos in two,
As if mountains and rivers were all turned upside down.

— Tie Pao Xing (The Iron Cannon Affair)

In 1353, Yuan Mongol forces used huotong (fire tubes) that fired "fire barbs" against the armies of Zhang Shicheng. In 1356, one of the Yuan gunners, Yang Paoshou (Yang "Cannon hand"), defected to Zhu Yuanzhang's side. He led a detachment of hand gunners against the forces of Chen Youliang in 1363. By the time of Jiao Yu and his Huolongjing (a book that describes military applications of gunpowder in great detail) in the mid 14th century, the explosive potential of gunpowder was perfected, as the level of nitrate in gunpowder formulas had risen from a range of 12% to 91%, with at least 6 different formulas in use that are considered to have maximum explosive potential for gunpowder. By that time, the Chinese had discovered how to create explosive round shot by packing their hollow shells with this nitrate-enhanced gunpowder.

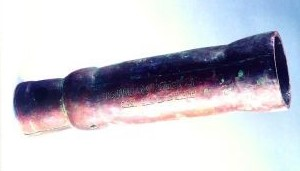
The Xanadu Gun, 1298

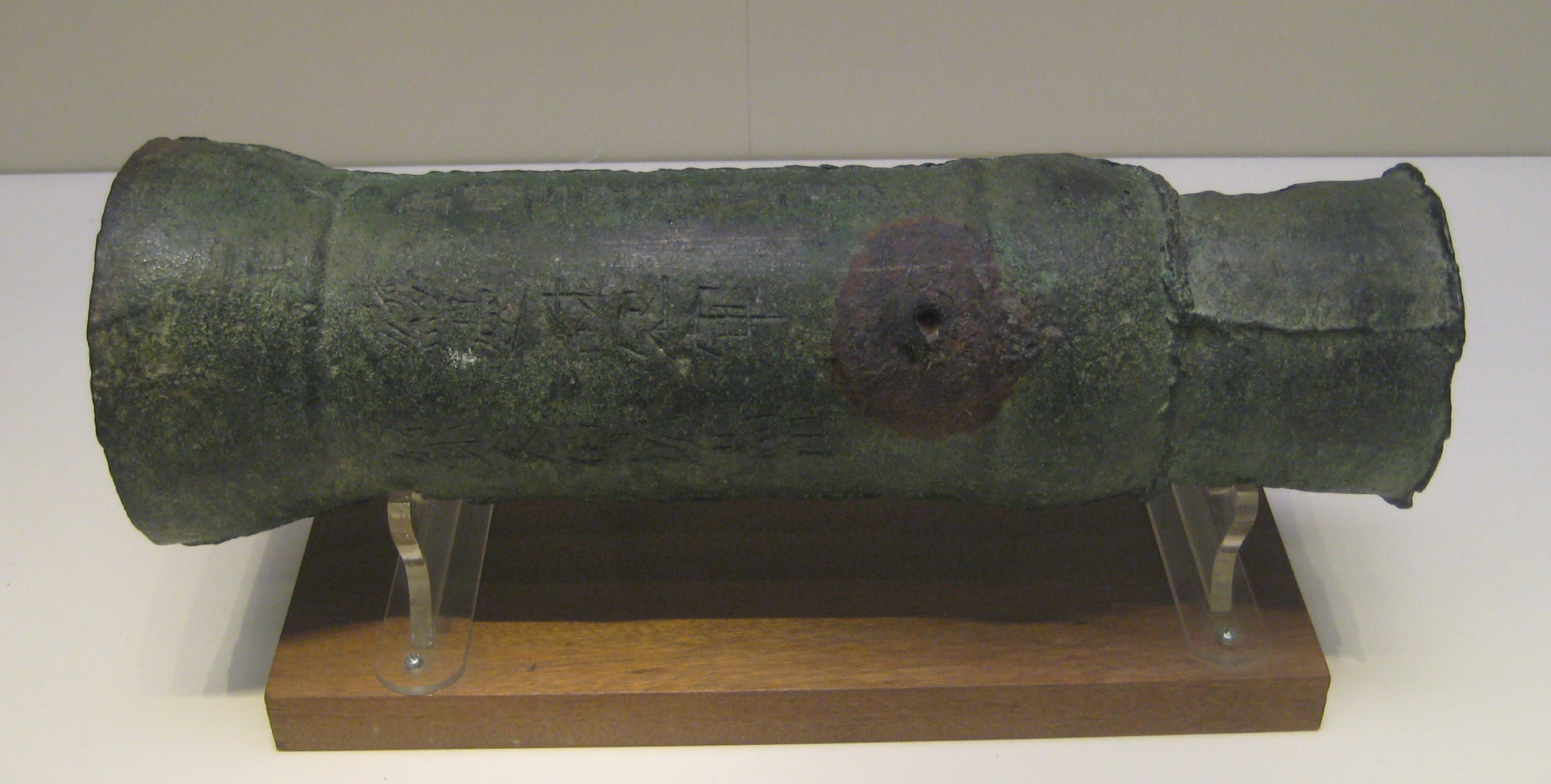
Bronze cannon with inscription dated the 3rd year of the Zhiyuan era (1332) of the Yuan Dynasty (1271–1368); it was discovered at the Yunju Temple of Fangshan District, Beijing in 1935. It is similar to Xanadu gun.

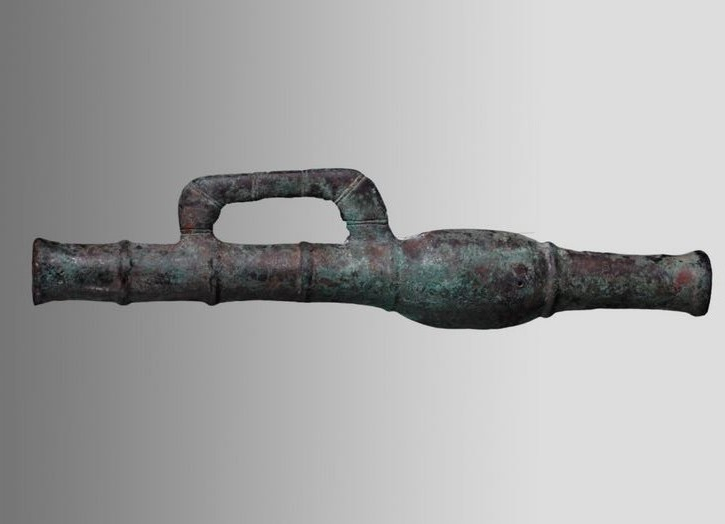
Hand cannon with handle, Yuan dynasty, 1341

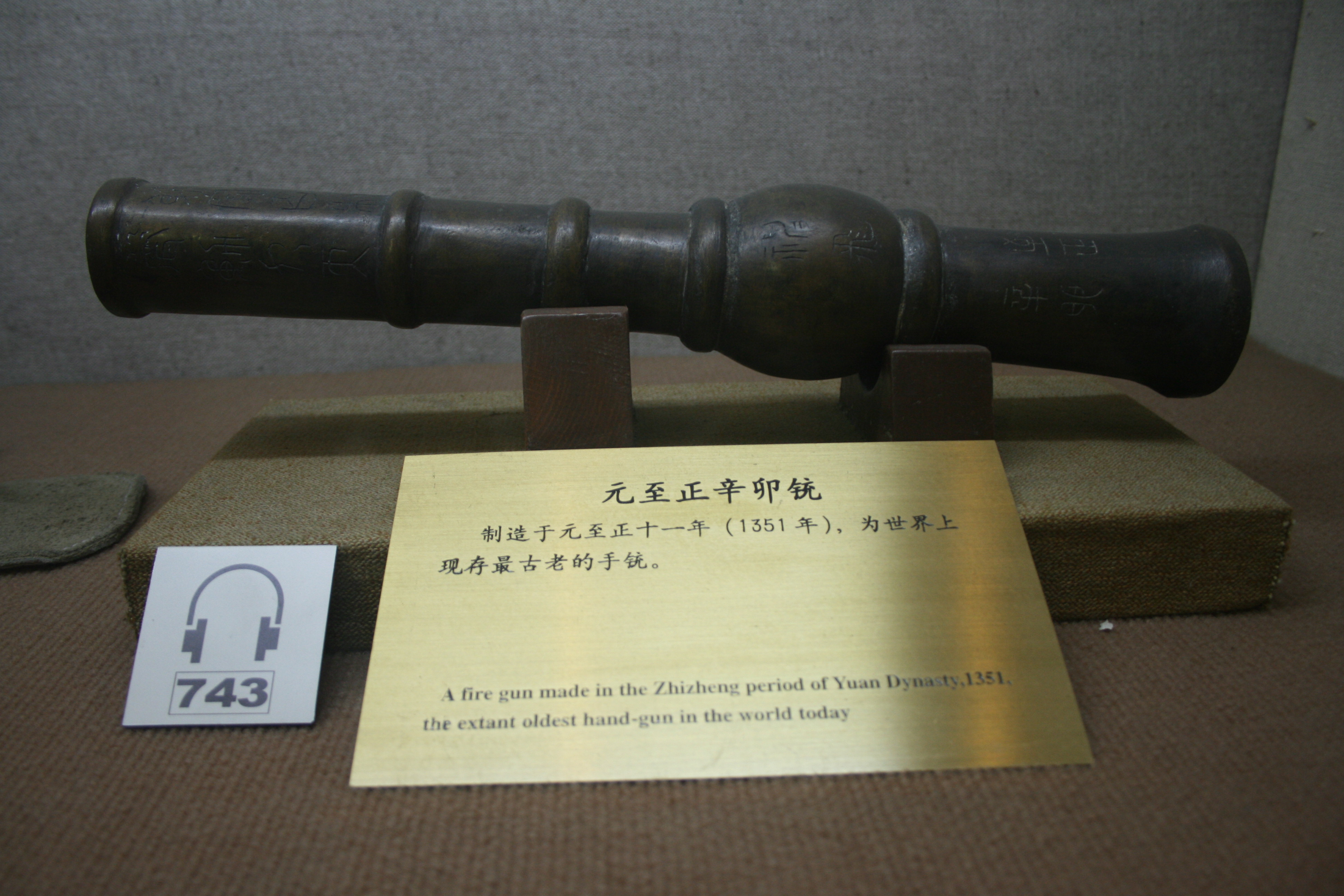
Hand cannon, Yuan dynasty, 1351

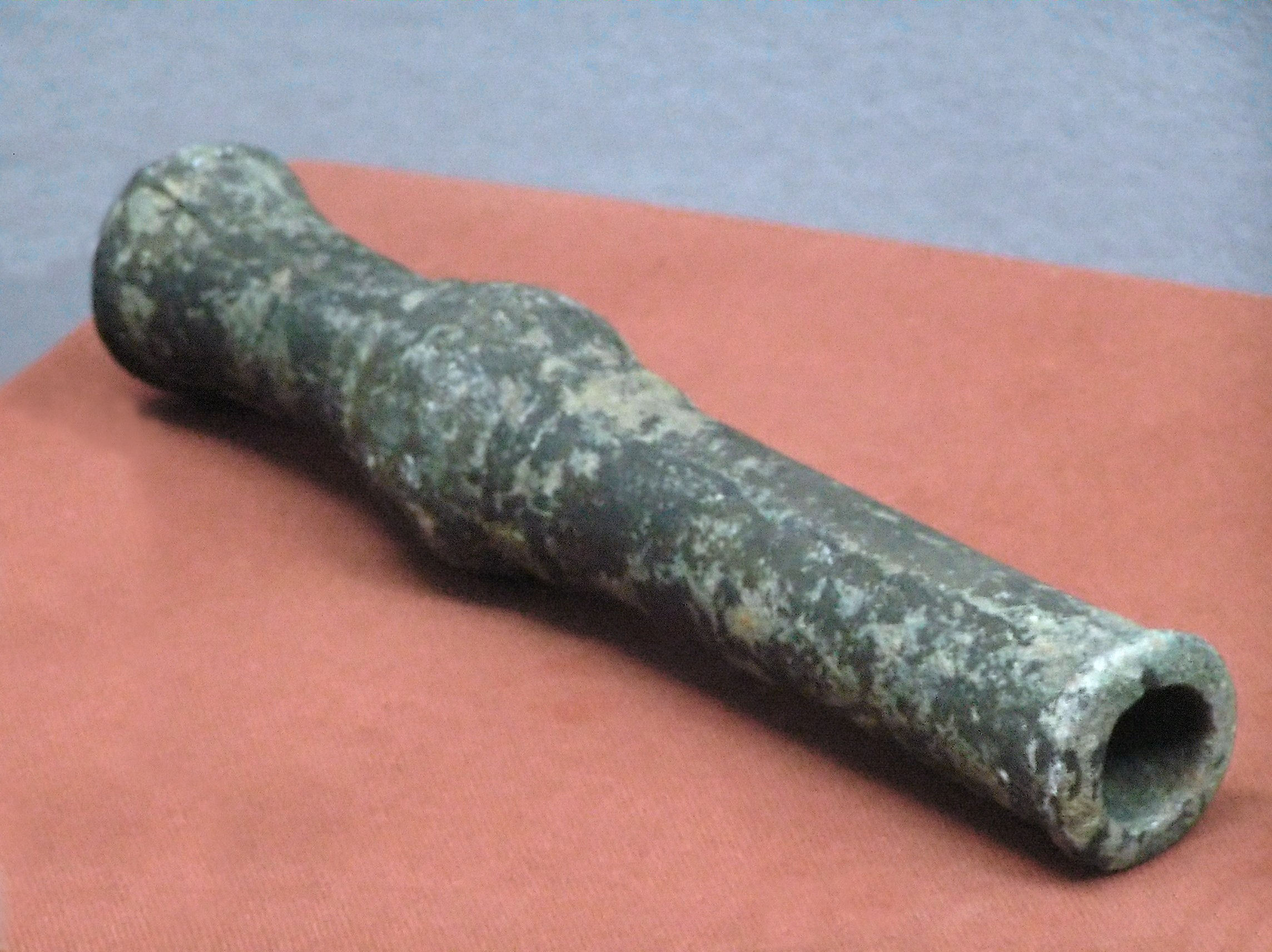
Chinese hand cannon, Yuan dynasty.

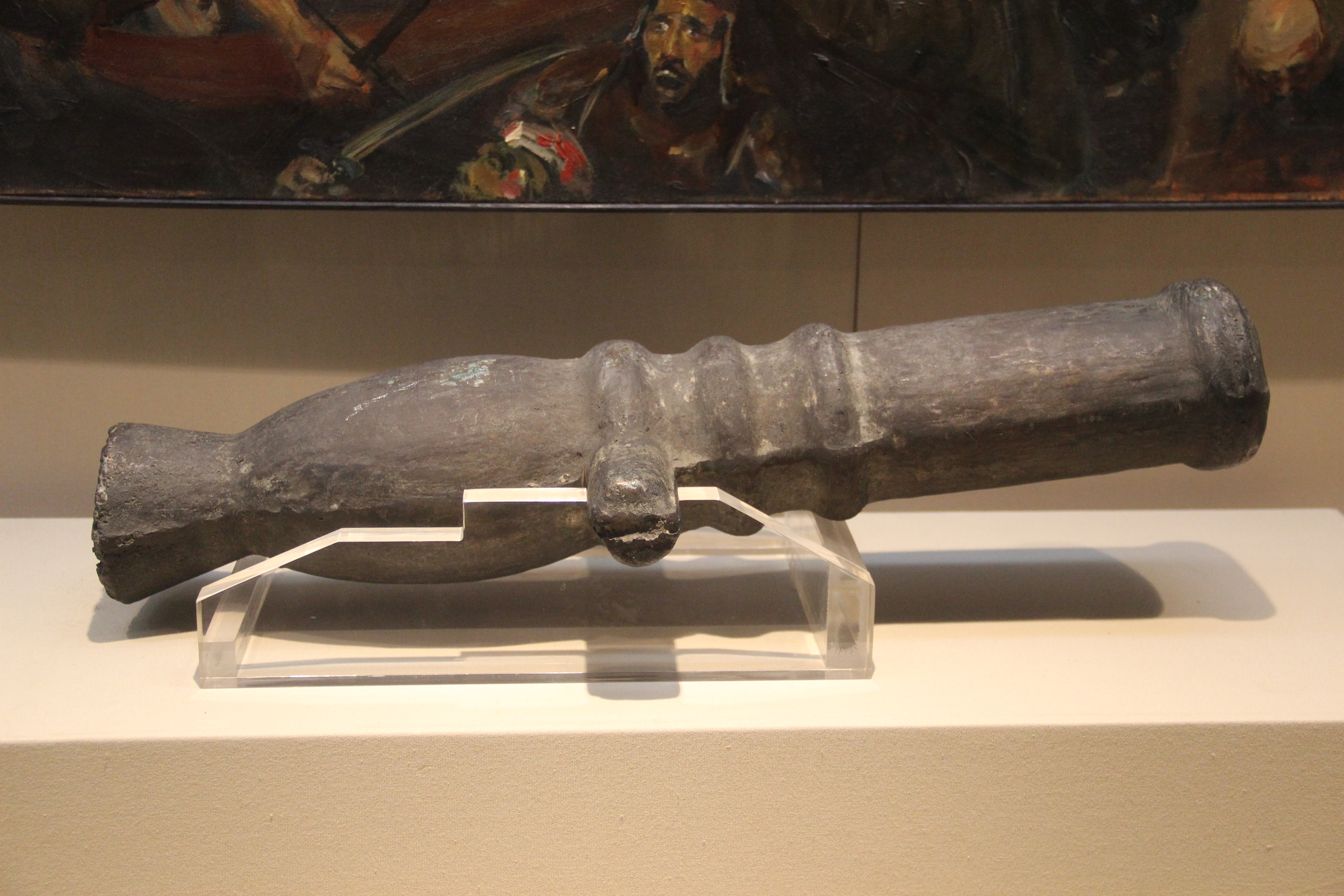
Cannion with trunnions, Yuan dynasty

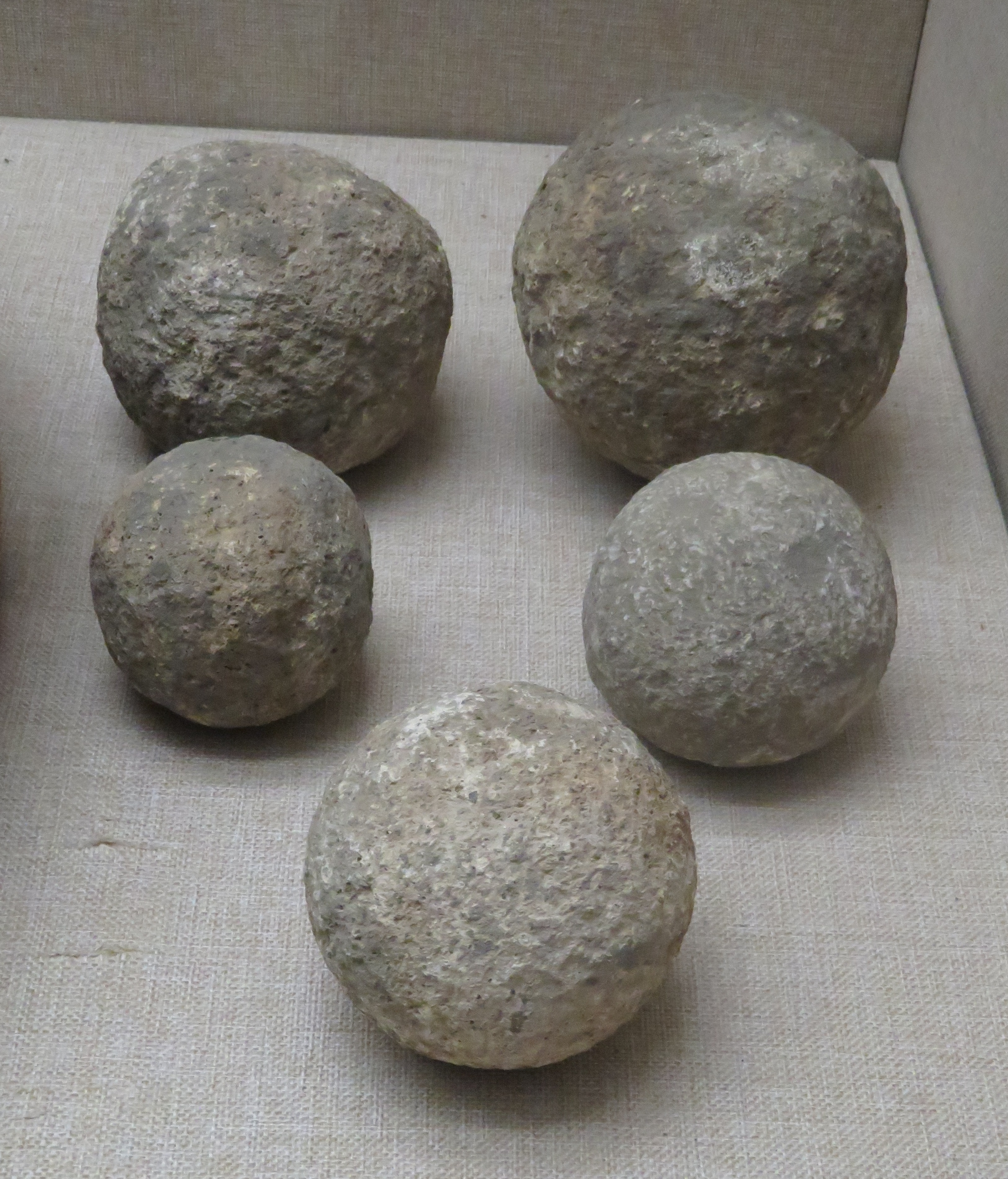
Stone cannonballs, Yuan dynasty

== Navy ==
Battles of 1277 involved massive naval forces on both sides. In the last battle near Guangzhou in 1279, which had been the last temporary capital of the Song dynasty, the Yuan captured more than 800 warships.

The Yuan was unusually sea-minded, attempting numerous maritime expeditions. After the Mongol invasions of Japan (1274, 900 ships, and in 1281, 4400 ships), Mongol invasion of Champa (1282), Mongol invasion of Java (1292, 1000 ships), in 1291 the Yuan attempted but did not ultimately proceed with an invasion of the Ryukyu Islands. However, none of these invasions were successful. Kublai contemplated launching a third invasion of Japan but was forced to back down due to fierce public disapproval. The Yuan era naval advances has been described as a successor of the Song dynasty achievements and an antecedent of the Ming's treasure fleets. An important function of the Yuan navy was the shipping of grain from the South to the capital of modern-day Beijing. There was fierce 50-year interdepartmental rivalry between the fleets shipping by the Grand Canal and shipping by the Yellow Sea, which ended with the eventual dominance of the Grand Canal in China until modern times. The failed invasions also demonstrated a weakness of the Mongols — the inability to mount naval invasions successfully.

Shortly after the Mongol invasions of Japan (1274–1281), the Japanese produced a scroll painting depicting a bomb. Called tetsuhau in Japanese, the bomb is speculated to have been the Chinese thunder crash bomb. Archaeological evidence of the use of gunpowder was finally confirmed when multiple shells of the explosive bombs were discovered in an underwater shipwreck off the shore of Japan by the Kyushu Okinawa Society for Underwater Archaeology. X-rays by Japanese scientists of the excavated shells provided proof that they contained gunpowder.

The Yuan forces may have also used cannons during the invasion. The Nihon Kokujokushi, written around 1300, mentions huo tong (fire tubes) at the Battle of Tsushima in 1274 and the second coastal assault led by Holdon in 1281. The Hachiman Gudoukun of 1360 mentions iron pao "which caused a flash of light and a loud noise when fired." The Taiheiki mentions a weapon shaped like a bell that made a noise like thunder-clap and shot out thousands of iron balls.

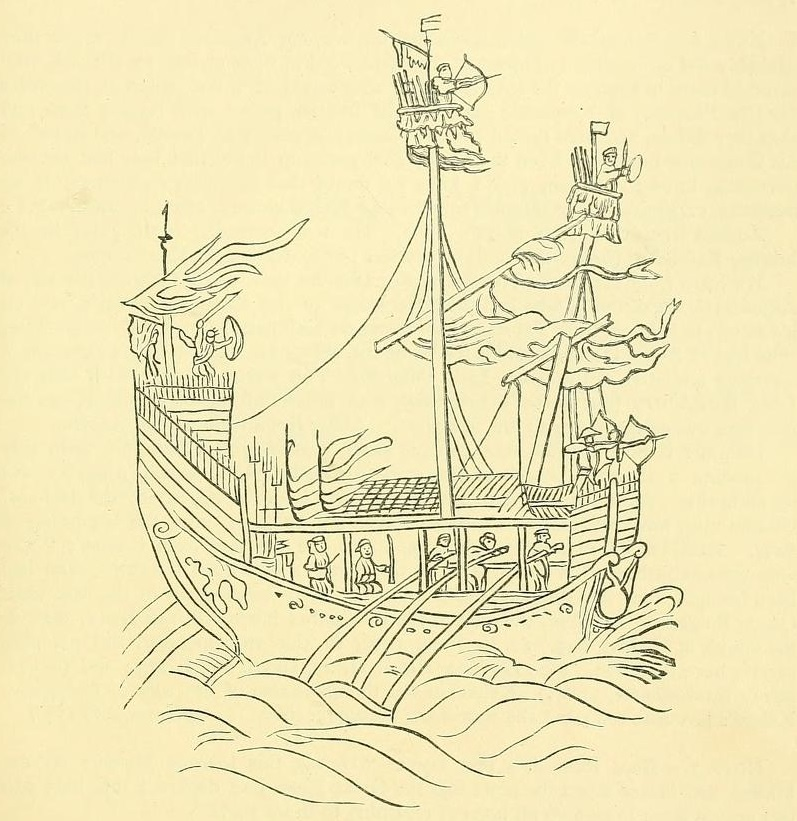
Drawing of a Chinese vessel that might have been a Yuan junk. From a Chinese Encyclopaedia called San-Thsai-Thou-Hoei.

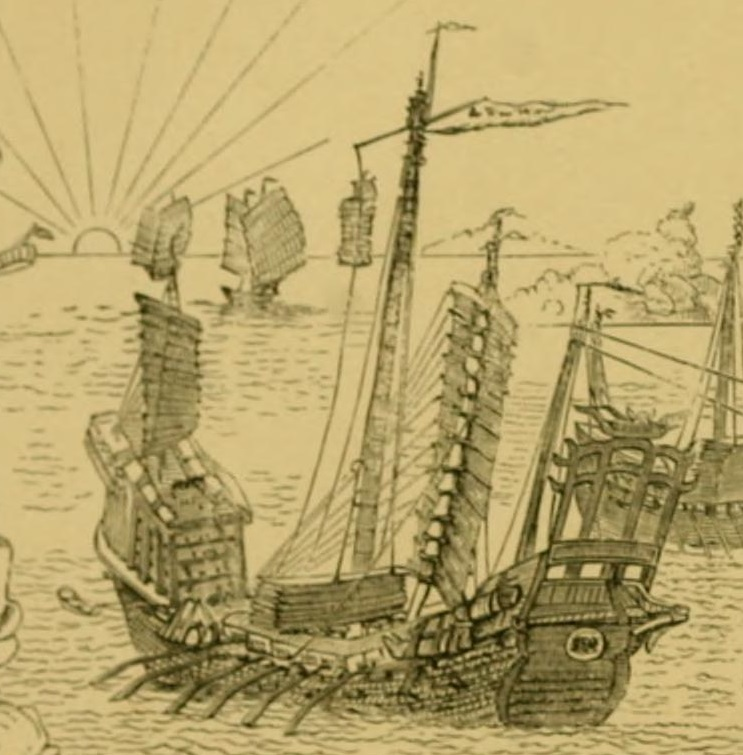
Sir Henry Yule's 1871 illustration of Yuan dynasty war junk used in the invasion of Java of 1293.

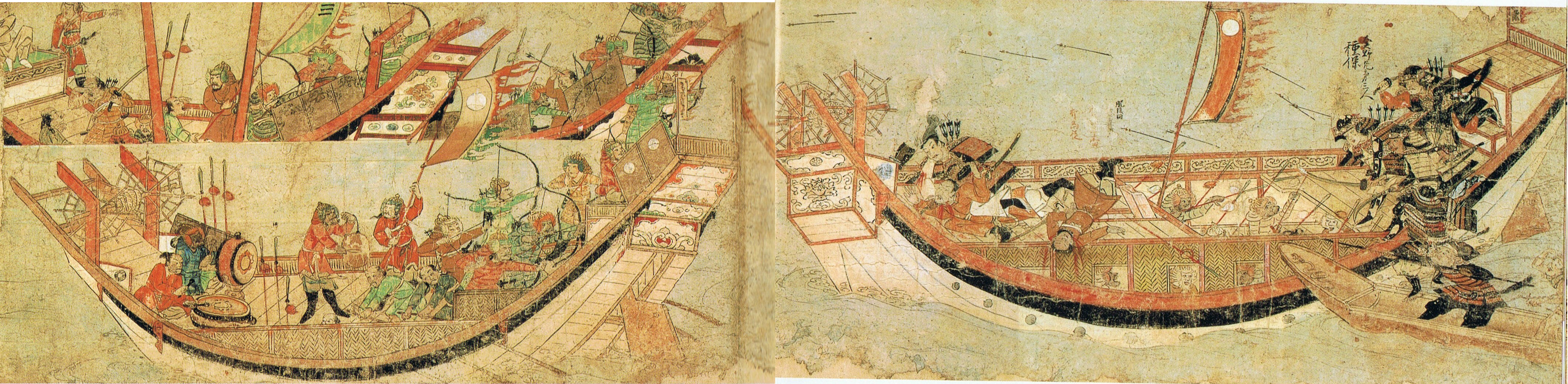
Yuan ships as depicted by Japanese, 1293. Depicting the 1281 invasion of Japan.

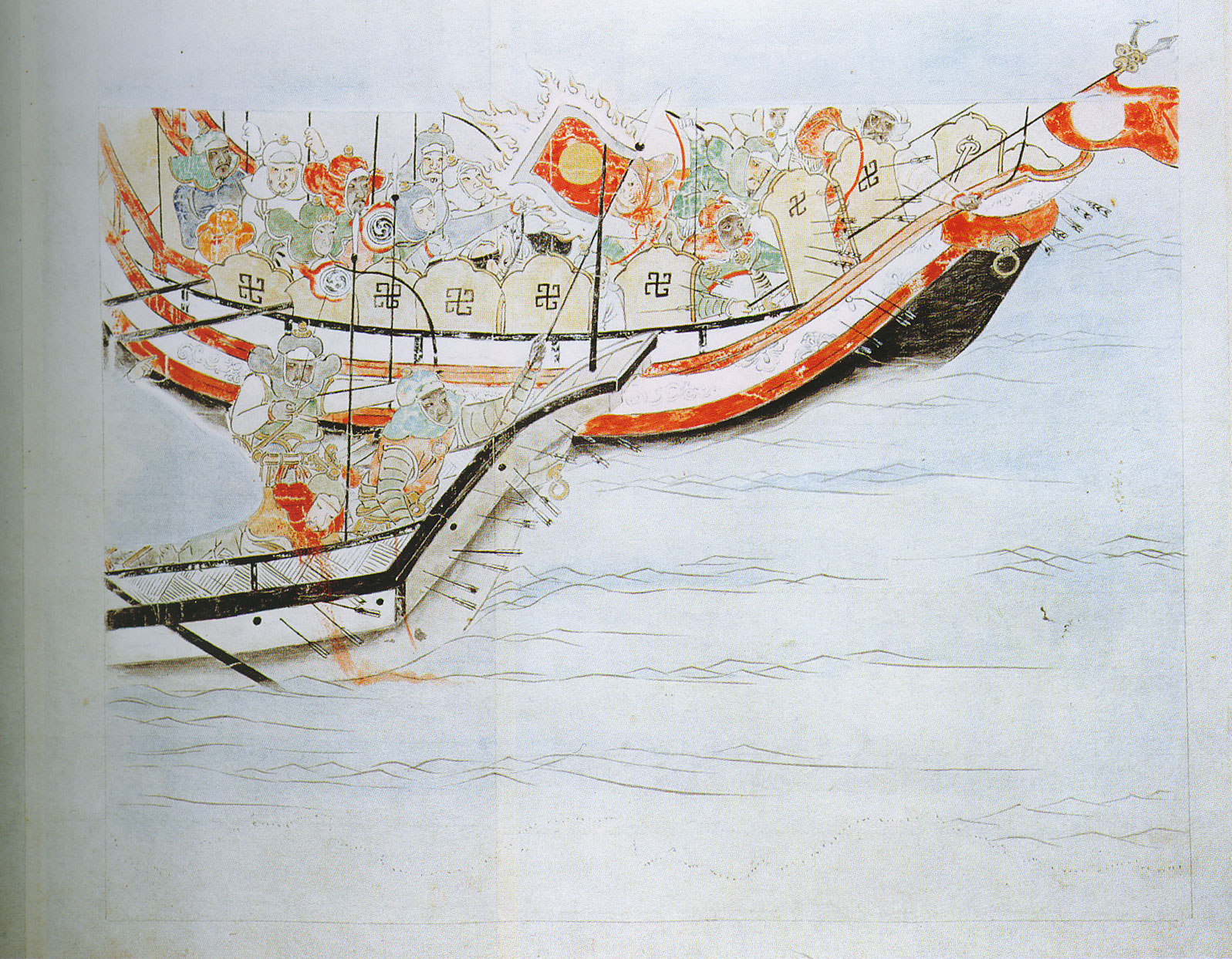
Mongol ships, from scrolls on the Mongol invasions (Japanese: Mooko shuurai e-kotoba), by Fukuda Taika, 1846.

== Flags and banners ==
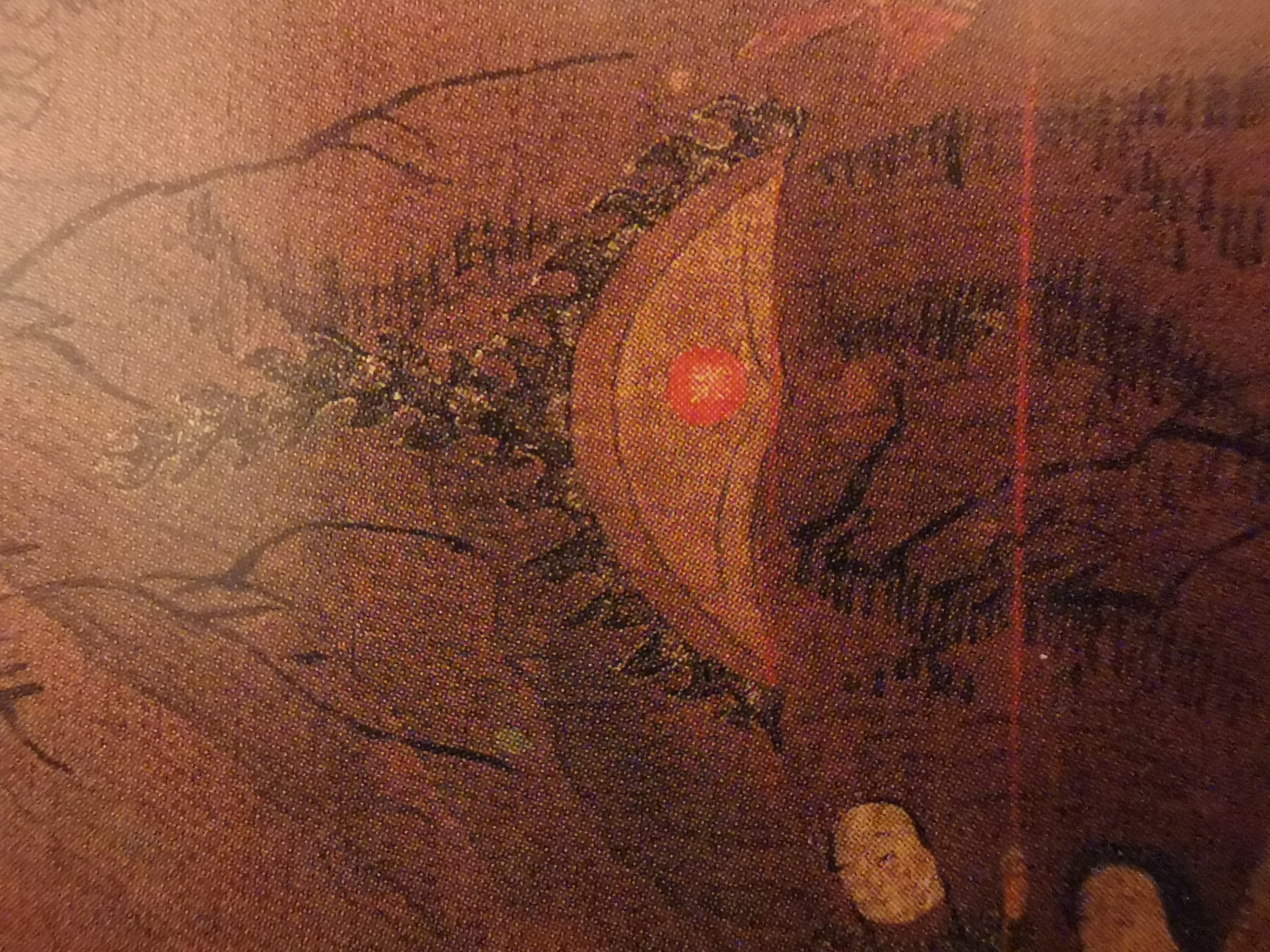

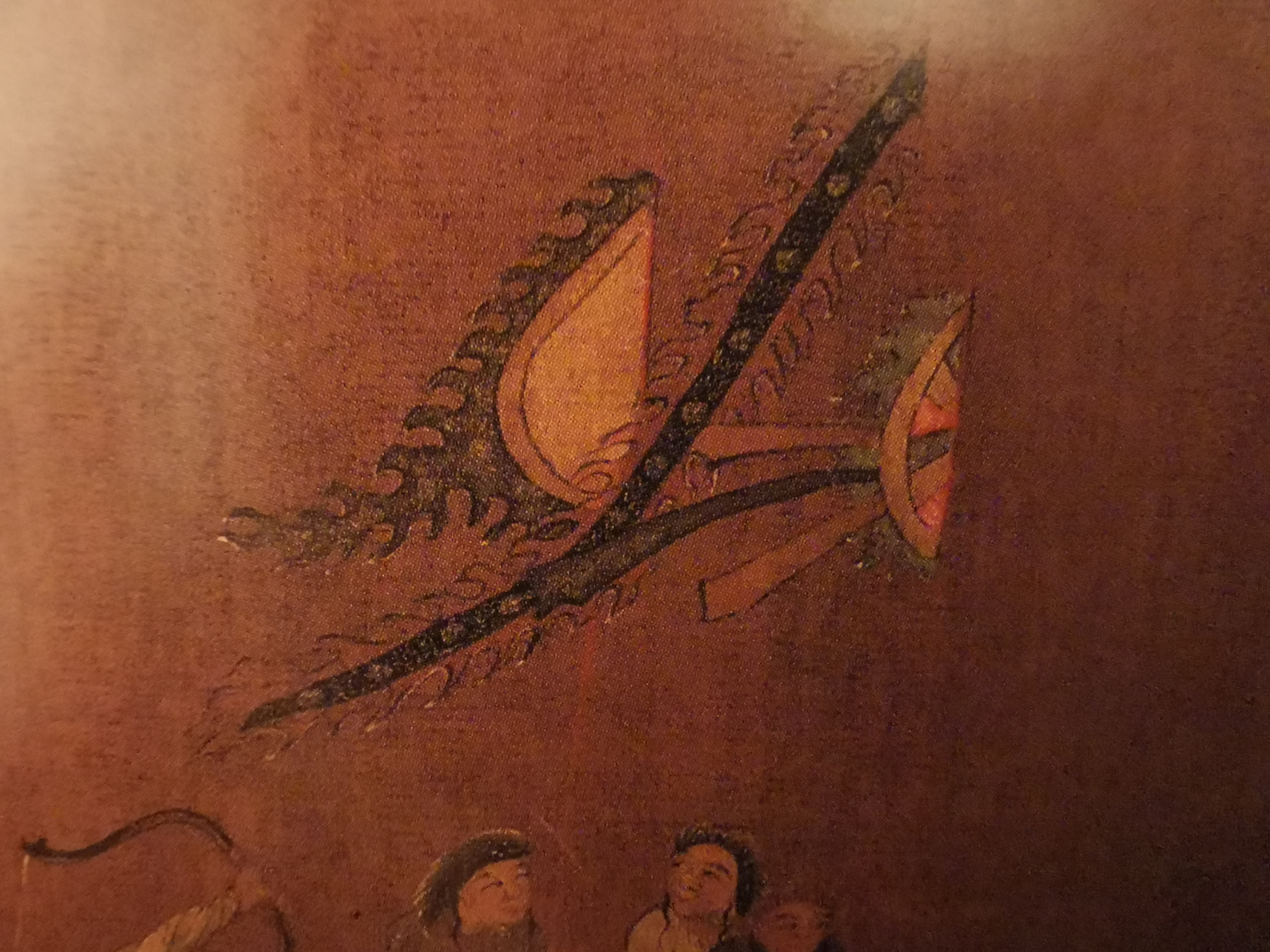

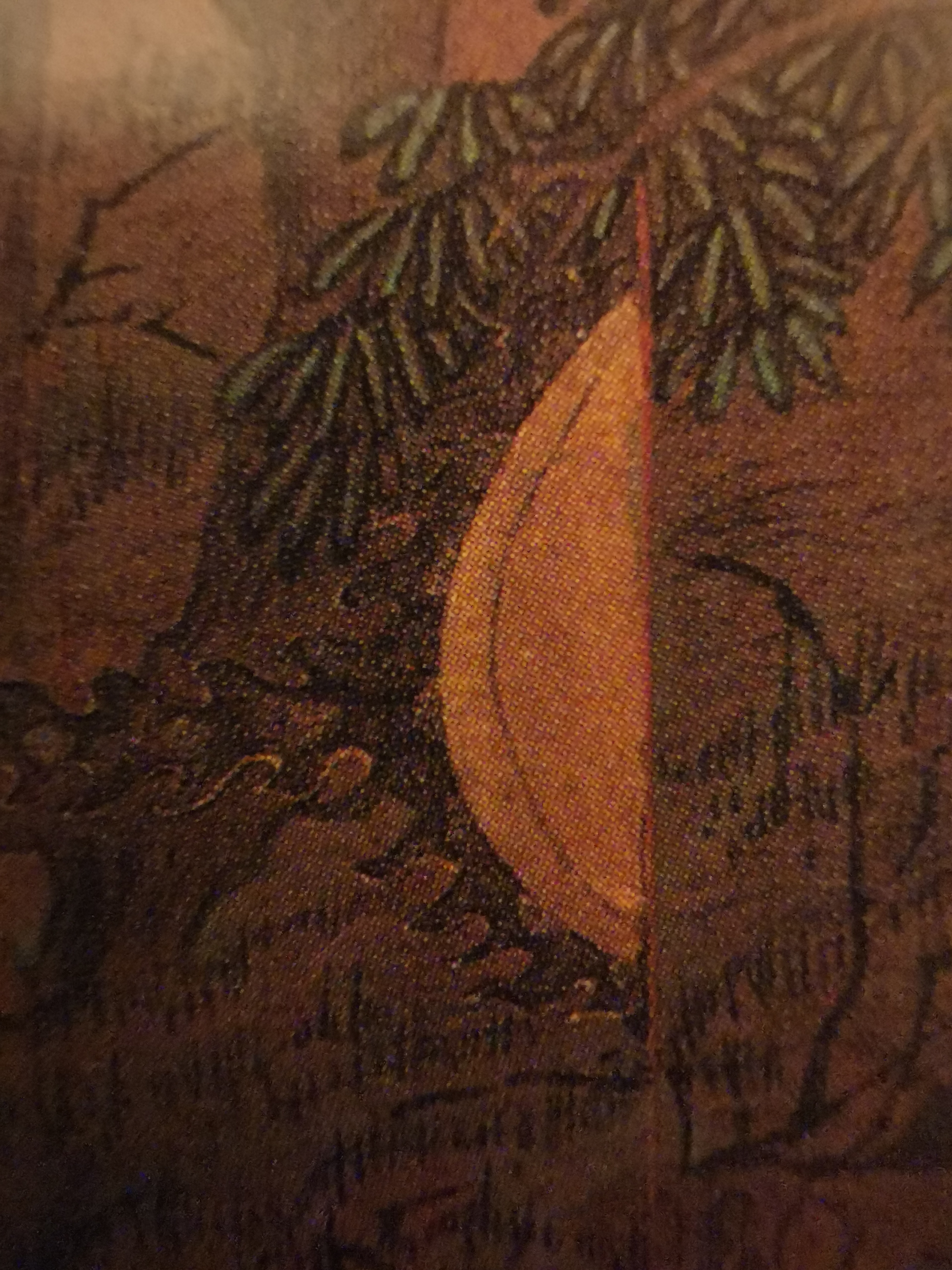

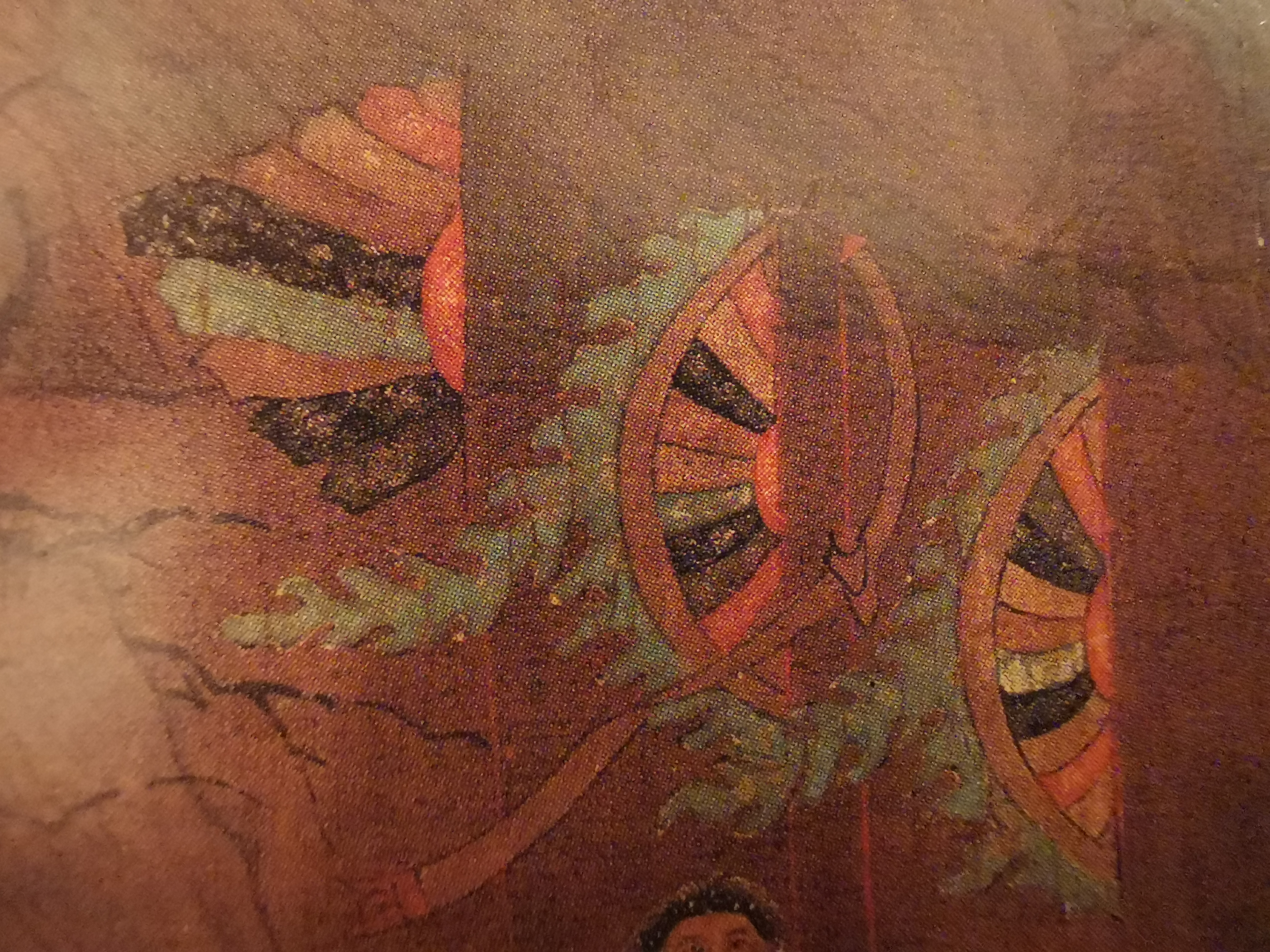

== Bibliography ==
- Amitai-Preiss, Reuven. Mongols and Mamluks: The Mamluk‐Ilkhanid War, 1260–1281. Cambridge: Cambridge University Press, 1995.
- Andrade, Tonio (2016), The Gunpowder Age: China, Military Innovation, and the Rise of the West in World History, Princeton University Press, ISBN 978-0-691-13597-7.
- Arnold, Thomas (2001), The Renaissance at War, Cassell & Co, ISBN 978-0-304-35270-8
- Chambers, James, The Devil's Horsemen: The Mongol Invasion of Europe. Book Sales Press, 2003.
- Dupuy, R.E. and T.N. Dupuy. The Encyclopedia Of Military History: From 3500 B.C. to the Present. (2nd Revised Edition 1986).
- Hildinger, Erik. Warriors of the Steppe: A Military History of Central Asia, 500 B.C. to A.D. 1700. Cambridge, MA: Da Capo Press, 2001.
- Iggulden, Conn. Genghis: Birth of an Empire. New York: Delacorte Press, 2007.
- Jones, Archer. Art of War in the Western World. Champaign: University of Illinois Press, 1987.
- Liang, Jieming (2006), Chinese Siege Warfare: Mechanical Artillery & Siege Weapons of Antiquity, Singapore: Leong Kit Meng, ISBN 978-981-05-5380-7
- Lu, Gwei-Djen (1988), "The Oldest Representation of a Bombard", Technology and Culture, 29 (3): 594–605, doi:10.2307/3105275, JSTOR 3105275, S2CID 112733319
- May, Timothy. "The Mongol Art of War." Westholme Publishing, Yardley. 2007.
- May, Timothy (2016). The Mongol Empire: A Historical Encyclopedia. ABC-CLIO. ISBN 9781610693400.
- Morgan, David. The Mongols. Hoboken, NJ: Wiley-Blackwell, 2007. ISBN 978-1405135399
- Needham, Joseph (1971), Science and Civilization in China Volume 4 Part 3, Cambridge At The University Press
- Needham, Joseph (1980), Science & Civilisation in China, vol. 5 pt. 4, Cambridge University Press, ISBN 978-0-521-08573-1
- Needham, Joseph (1986), Science & Civilisation in China, vol. V:7: The Gunpowder Epic, Cambridge University Press, ISBN 978-0-521-30358-3.
- Nicolle, David. The Mongol Warlords. Brockhampton Press, 1998.
- Charles Oman. The History of the Art of War in the Middle Ages (1898, rev. ed. 1953)
- Partington, J. R. (1960), A History of Greek Fire and Gunpowder, Cambridge, UK: W. Heffer & Sons.
- Partington, J. R. (1999), A History of Greek Fire and Gunpowder, Baltimore: Johns Hopkins University Press, ISBN 978-0-8018-5954-0
- Patrick, John Merton (1961), Artillery and Warfare During the Thirteenth and Fourteenth Centuries, Utah State University Press
- Peers, CJ (2006), Soldiers of the Dragon, Osprey Publishing, ISBN 1846030986
- Purton, Peter (2010), A History of the Late Medieval Siege, 1200–1500, Boydell Press, ISBN 978-1-84383-449-6
- Saunders, J.J. The History of the Mongol Conquests. Routledge & Kegan Paul, 1971. ISBN 0-8122-1766-7
- Sicker, Martin. The Islamic World in Ascendancy: From the Arab Conquests to the Siege of Vienna. Westport, CT: Praeger, 2000.
- Souček, Svatopluk. A History of Inner Asia. Cambridge: Cambridge University Press, 2000.
- Twitchett, Dennis; Franke, Herbert, eds. (1994). The Cambridge History of China, Volume 6: Alien Regimes and Border States, 907–1368. Cambridge: Cambridge University Press. ISBN 978-0-521-24331-5.
- Verbruggen, J.F. The Art of Warfare in Western Europe during the Middle Ages. Boydell Press, Second English translation 1997, ISBN 0-85115-570-7
