= Chassepot to FAMAS =

2019 firearms history book by Ian McCollum

Chassepot to FAMAS: French Military Rifles, 1866 – 2016
- Author: Ian McCollum
- Language: English
- Genre: Firearm history
- Published: 2019
- Publisher: Headstamp Publishing
- Pages: 532

Chassepot to FAMAS: French Military Rifles, 1866–2016 is a 2019 book by Ian McCollum about the history of French military rifles. Chassepot to FAMAS was funded through Kickstarter, and it was the first book by Headstamp Publishing, which McCollum co-founded with N.R. Jenzen-Jones of Armament Research Services and James Rupley. The photography for the book was provided by Rupley and the book was edited by Jenzen-Jones. Yann Carcaillon and Jonathan Ferguson are listed as contributors.

== Content ==
Chassepot to FAMAS is separated into ten chapters, each dedicated to the rifles used by the French military from 1866 to 2016: the Chassepot, Gras, Kropatschek, Lebel, Berthier, RSC, MAS-36, MAS-49, FR F1 and the FAMAS. The book analyses the factors that led to the rifles' design choices, their production and combat use, and the appendix shows the reader how to field strip the rifles.

== History ==
McCollum, a collector of French rifles, wrote Chassepot to FAMAS over the course of three years, with the intention of it being used as a reference work for other firearm collectors and historians, as he had noted an absence of books available in English on the history of French rifles. McCollum planned to publish his book through Collector Grade Publications, but due to the death of Collector Grade's founder in 2018, he co-founded the Nashville-based Headstamp Publishing, through which he published the book. In 2019, a Kickstarter campaign was started to publish Chassepot to FAMAS, with an initial funding goal of $25,000, which it reached in two and a half hours. The book received $800,000 in donations by the time the Kickstarter had ended, making it the second most successful book on the platform. In 2021, McCollum began crowdfunding for his second book, Pistols of the Warlords: Chinese Domestic Handguns, 1911–1949.
