= Full30 =

American online video-sharing platform

- Company type: Private
- Website type: Video hosting service
- Headquarters: {{{location_country}}}
- Area served: Worldwide
- Founders: Tim Harmsen; Mark Hammonds
- Industry: Internet; Video hosting service
- Website: Full30.com
- Launched: 2014
- Current status: Defunct

Full30 was an American online video-sharing platform primarily dedicated to firearms and shooting sports-related content. The service was established in 2014 by Tim Harmsen and Mark Hammonds as a result of YouTube's increasing restrictions on gun-related videos.

== History ==
After the 2018 Parkland high school shooting, many companies attempted to distance themselves from any association with the firearms industry. As a result, YouTube began demonetizing and sometimes outright deleting firearms-related videos, and in one case, popular YouTube poster Hickok45's channel was completely deleted but later restored. In response, Harmsen, who operates the Military Arms Channel on YouTube, decided to create his own video-hosting website to allow himself and other firearms content creators a platform free from such restrictions; he named the website Full30 — a reference to the popular 30-round STANAG magazine.

In July 2020, site representatives announced the site had new ownership.

By the end of 2022, the site began to be redirected to a series of other websites. By 2025, it was largely deactivated with the front page replaced by a form to be filled out to receive "updates", with no other explanation.

== Contributors ==
- Hickok45
- Military Arms Channel
- Forgotten Weapons
- Bavarian Shooter
- Liberty Doll
- CloverTac
