= Calibres de France =

French system of standardization of cannons

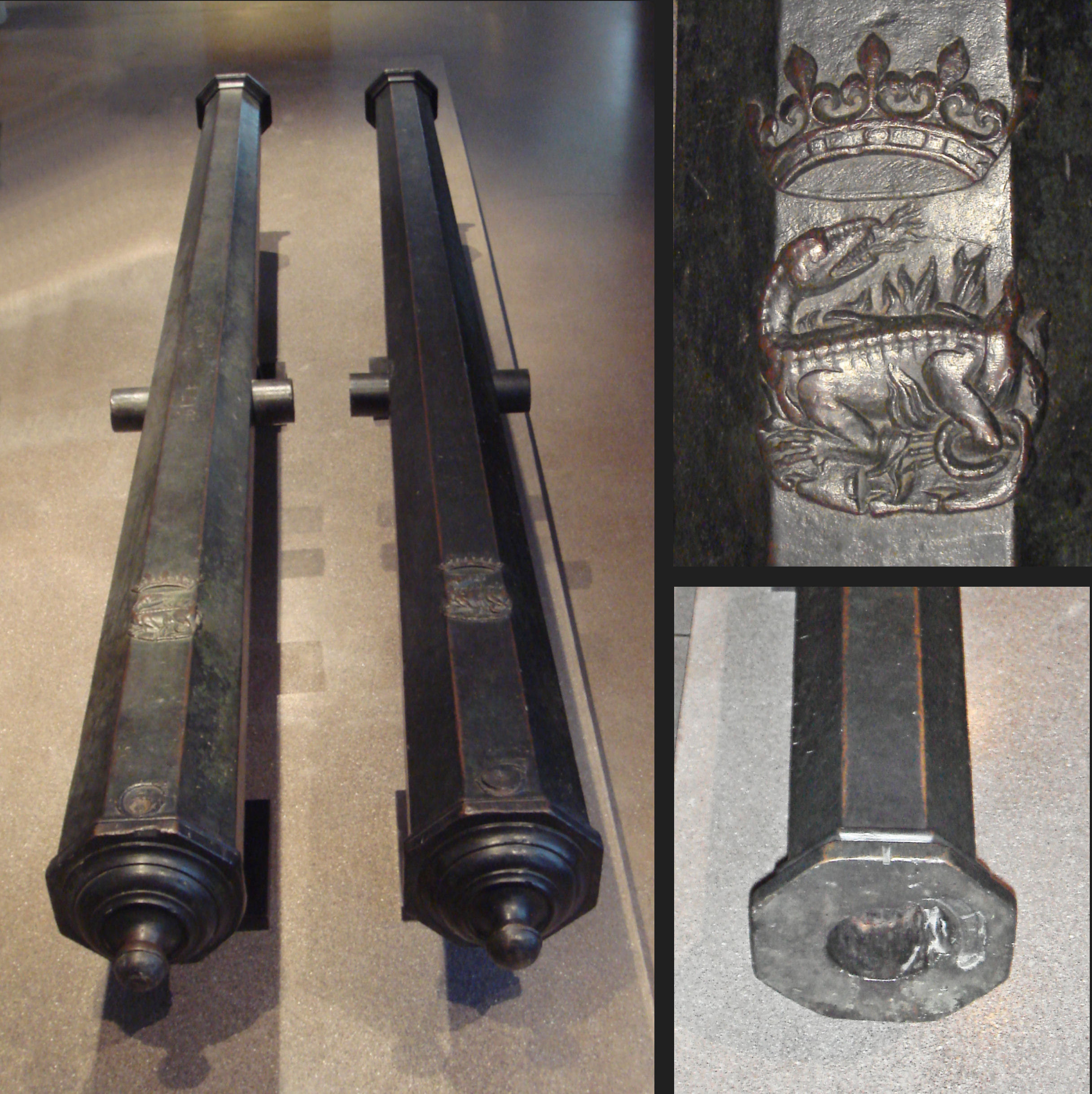
Coulevrines moyennes ("Middle culverins"), French work at the time of Francis I, 1520, caliber: 82mm and 77mm, length: 295cm, weight 617kg, ammunition: 1.5kg iron ball.

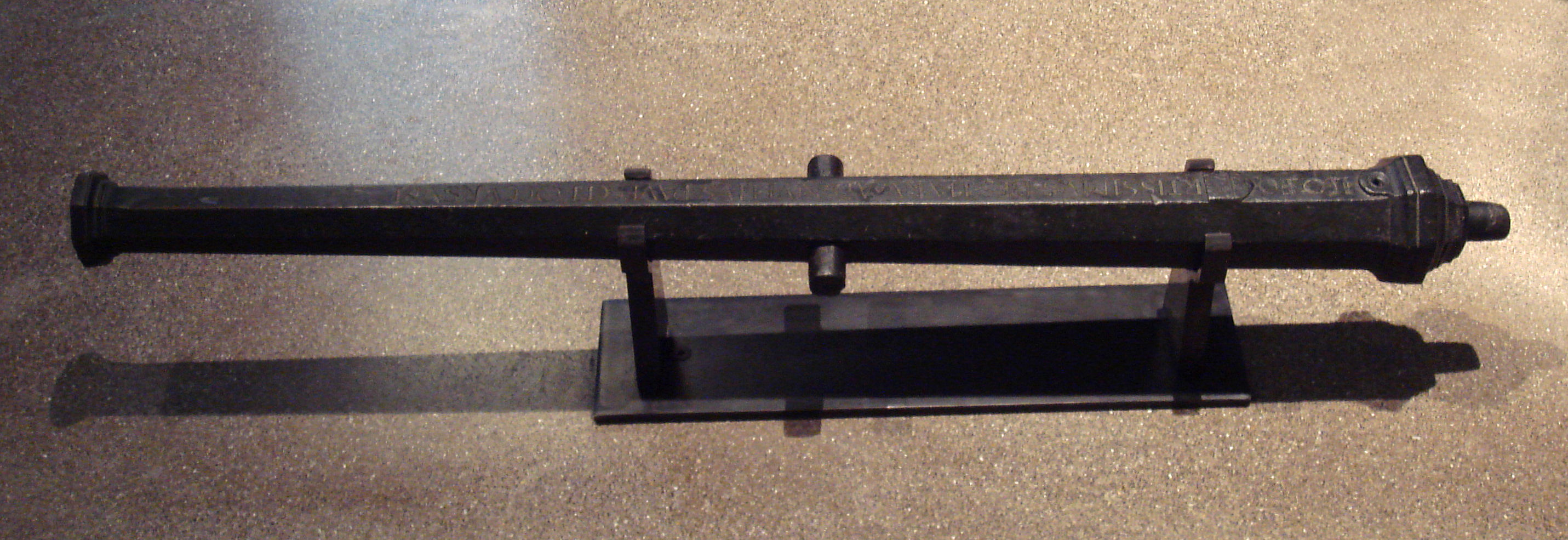
A Fauconneau, which was to become the smallest of the Calibres de France. Bronze, French manufacture, 1510. Caliber: 32mm, length: 106cm, weight: 25kg, ammunition: iron ball.

The Calibres de France ("French calibers") was a system of standardization of cannons in France, established by King Francis I of France from about 1525. The objective was to simplify and codify cannonry, in order to facilitate production. On 26 September 1526, Francis I wrote about the artillerye de mon calibre ("Artillery of my caliber"), and an even earlier mention is known from 1512. The Calibres de France were formalized in an ordinance of 1552.

Six standard sizes were defined: the cannon (Canon), the "grand" culverin (Grande couleuvrine), the "bastard" culverin (Couleuvrine bâtarde), the "middle" culverin (Couleuvrine moyenne), the Falconet (Faucon), and the (Fauconneau).

The system was expanded by an ordinance dated 27 November 1572, and an edict dates December 1601.

The 6-guns Calibres de France system was still in place at the time of Louis XIII, which was later developed to an 18-guns system.

The system was phased out with the Keller system in 1666, and the De Vallière system on 7 October 1732.

== Other models ==
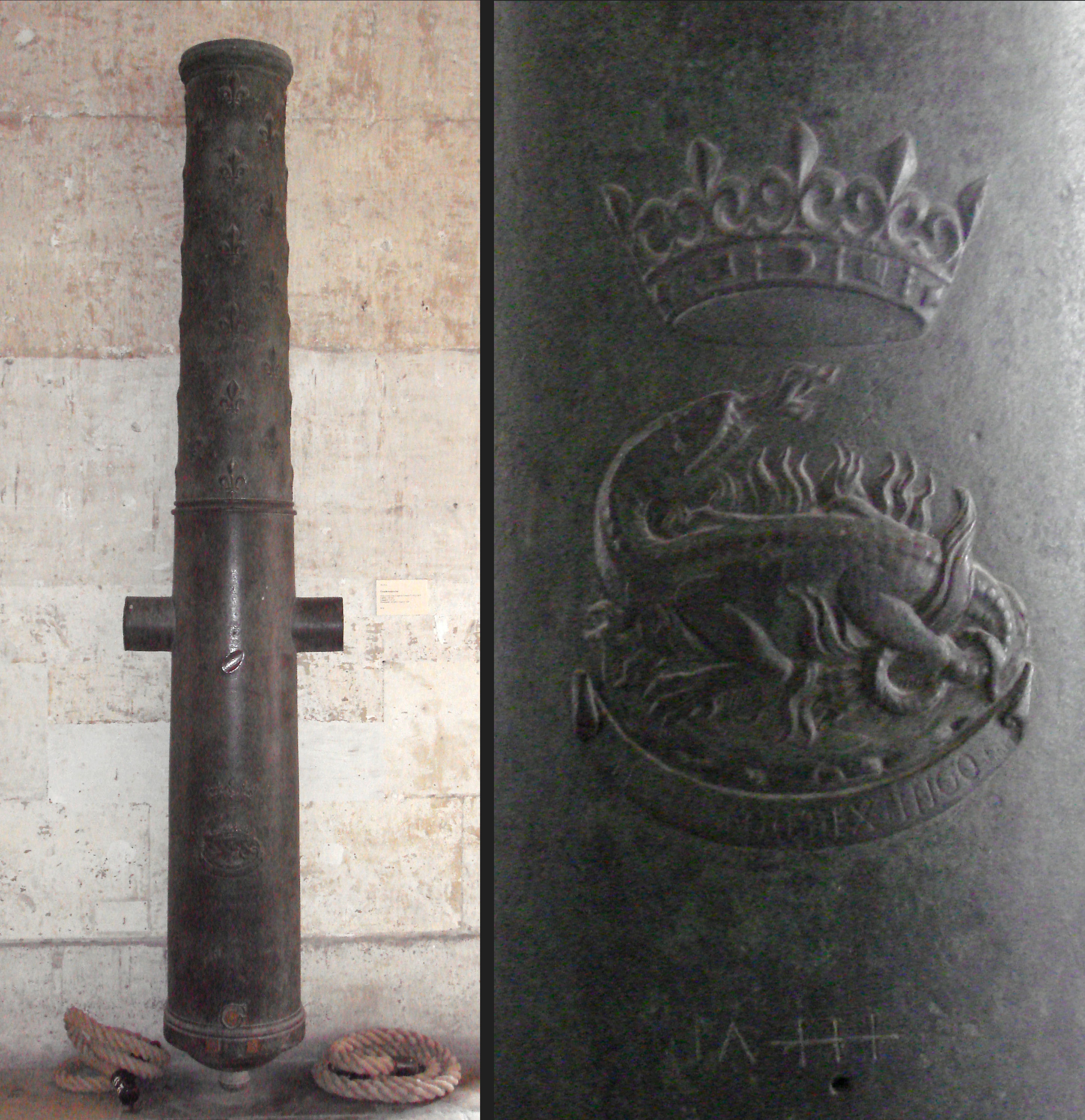
"Grande couleuvrine" of Francis I, caliber: 140mm, length: 307 cm, recovered in Algiers in 1830.

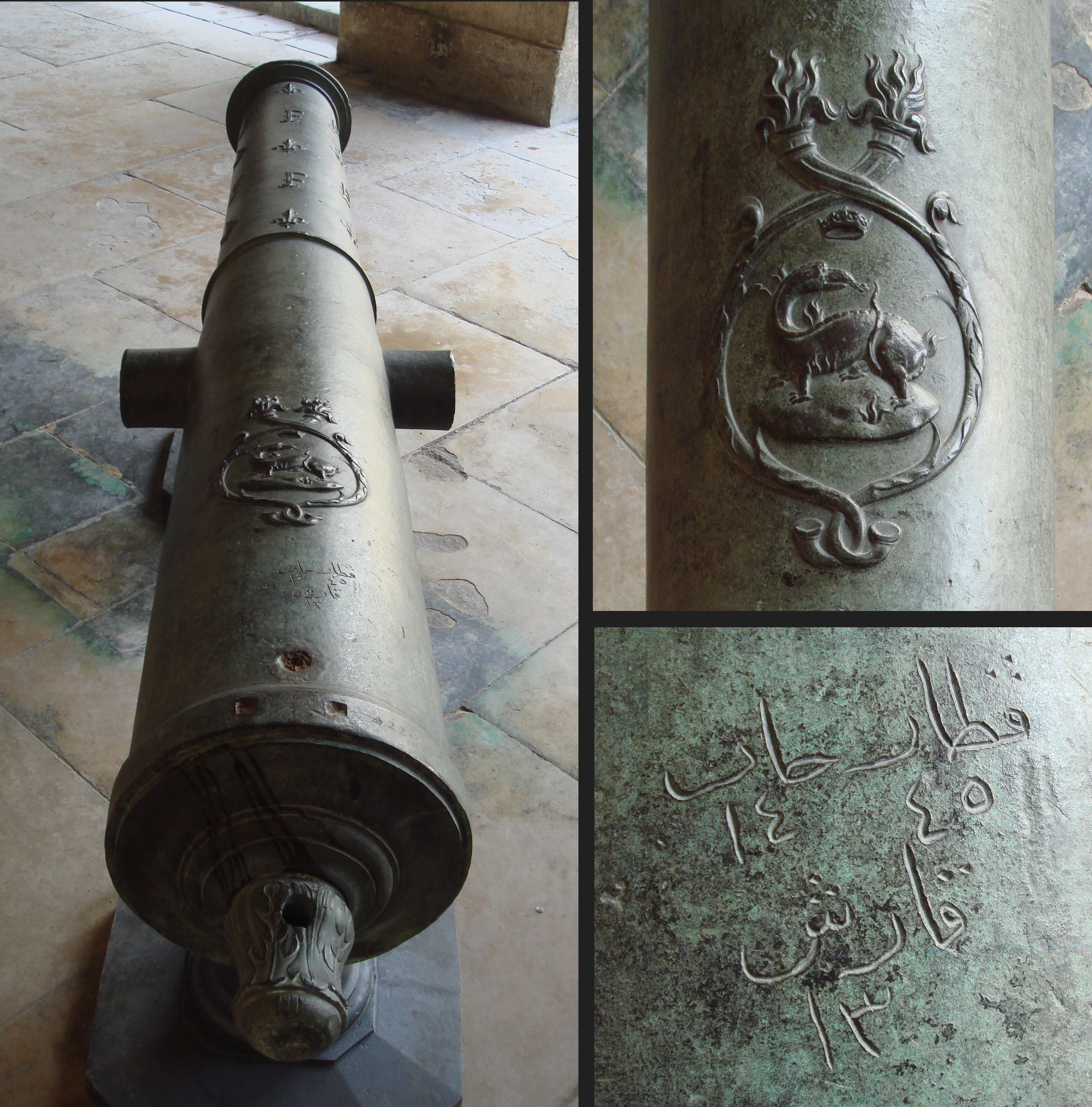
"Grande couleuvrine" of Francis I with Salamander emblem and inscription in Arabic, Siege of Rhodes (1522).

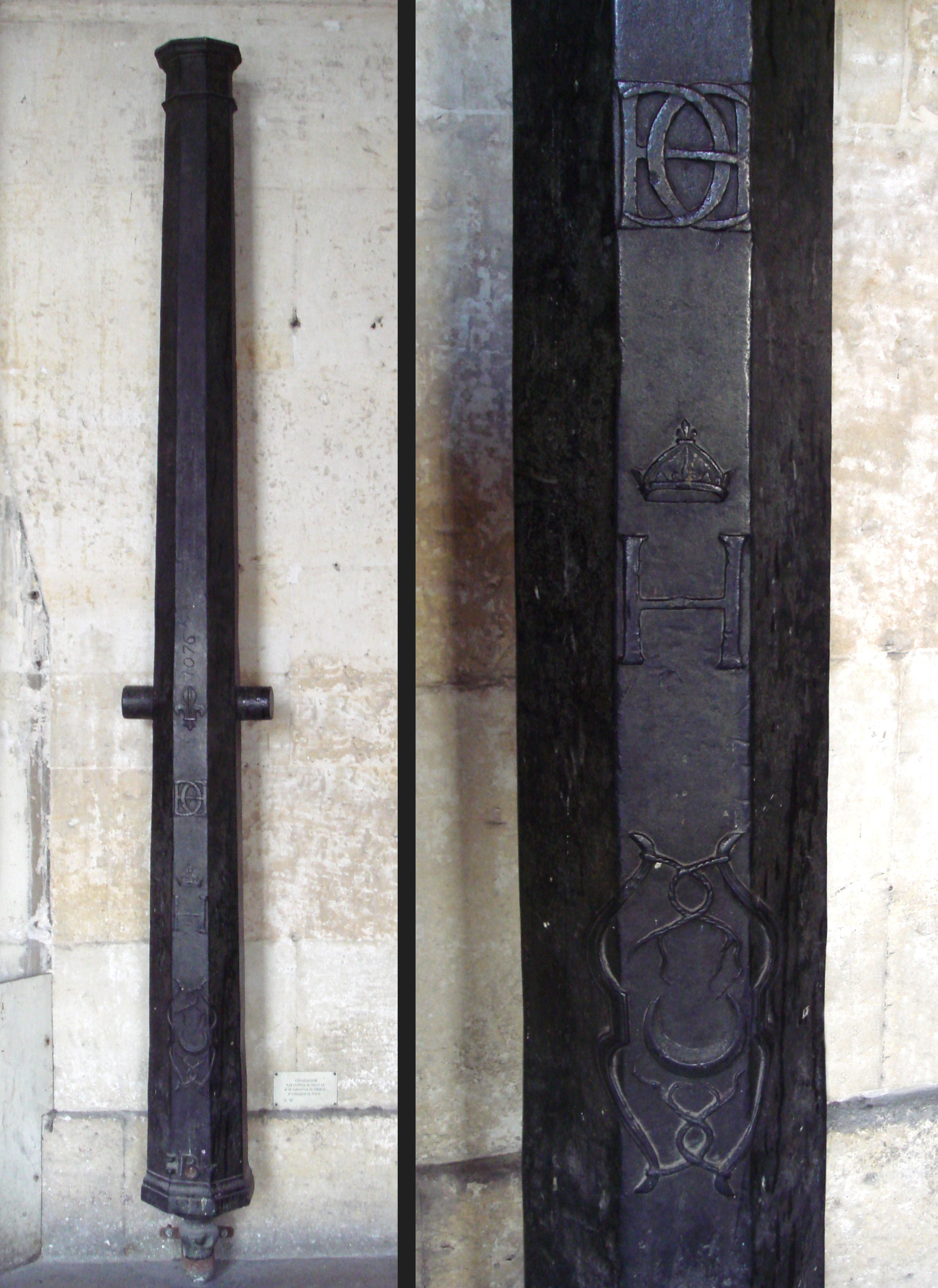
"Couleuvrine bâtarde" of 1548, with arms of Henri II and Catherine de Medicis and crescent of Diane. Caliber: 85mm, length: 300 cm, weight: 1076 kg.

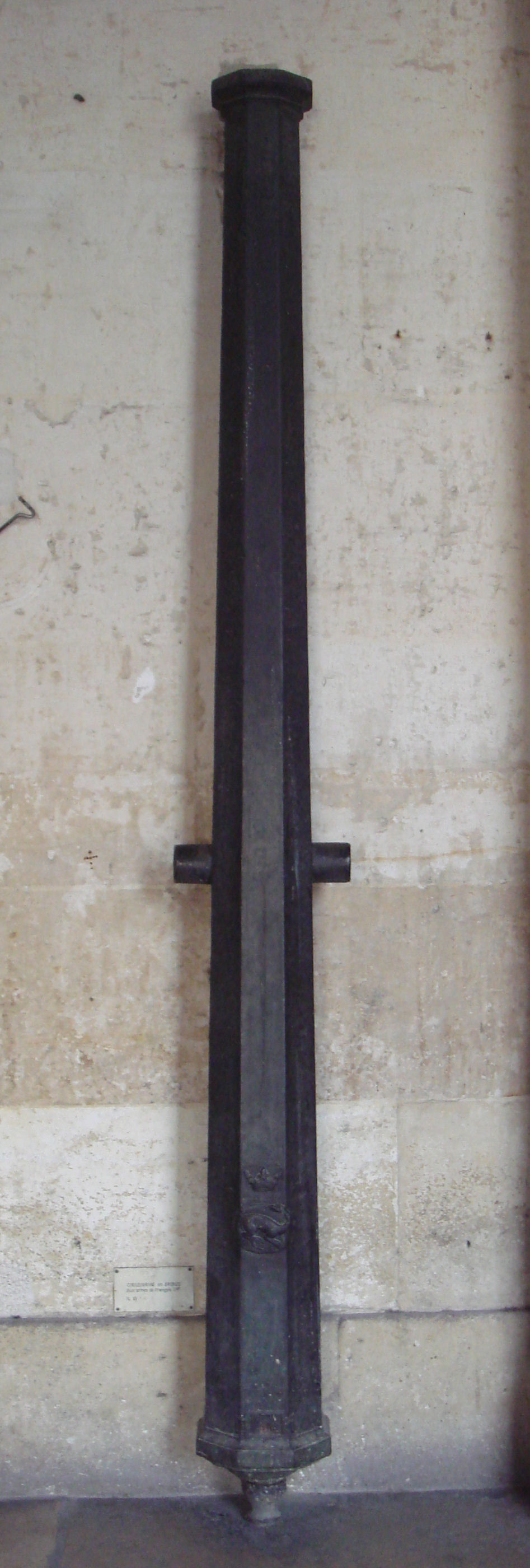
Bronze culverin of Francis I.

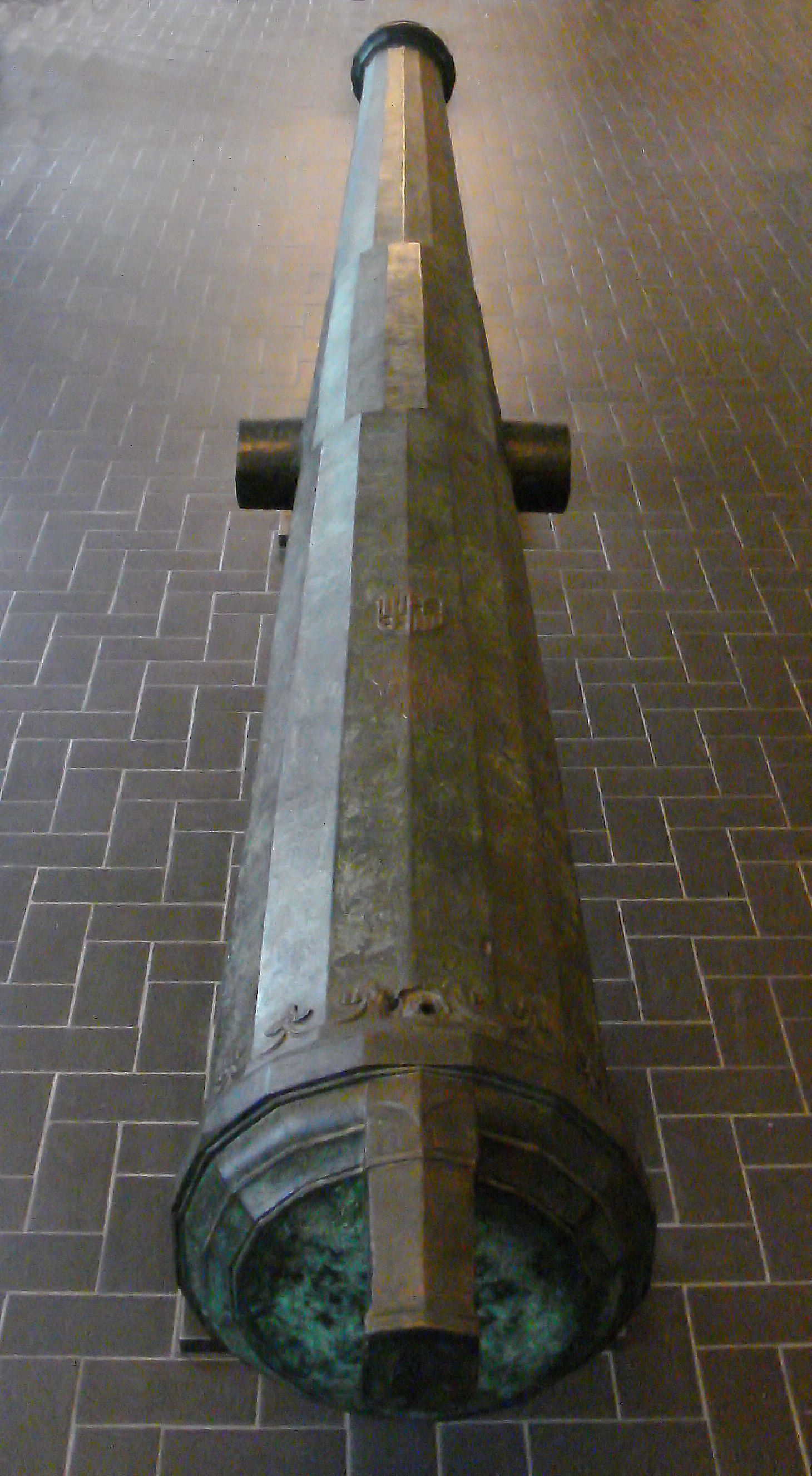
Grand culverin of the Knights Hospitallers, 1500-1510, Rhodes. French work, caliber: 165 mm, length: 540 cm, weight: 3,343 kg, ammunition: 15 kg iron ball. Arms of Grand Master Emery d'Amboise. Given by Abdülaziz to Napoleon III in 1862.
