= Forgotten Weapons =

Website and YouTube channel on firearms history

Ian McCollum

YouTube information
- Channel: Forgotten Weapons
- Years active: 2011-present
- Genre: Firearms/weapons
- Subscribers: 3.16 million
- Views: 1.7 billion
- Last updated: February 2, 2026
- Website: www.forgottenweapons.com

Forgotten Weapons is a website and channel appearing on YouTube, Full30 and Floatplane, created and presented by Ian McCollum. Forgotten Weapons covers the history of antique, obscure, and historically important firearms.

McCollum is also the author of several books on the topic of historical firearms, most notably "Chassepot to FAMAS: French Military Rifles 1866-2016" and "Small Arms of WWII: United States of America".

== Videos ==
Forgotten Weapons frequently features unusual, rare, odd, experimental, or one-off firearms, such as the paratroop versions of the Empire of Japan's Arisaka Type 99 rifle featuring a folding stock attached to a cabinet hinge. McCollum covers the history of such firearms in detail, and often explains how important certain firearms were to the development of weapon technologies and the history of warfare. He also usually explains the functioning and parts of the gun by disassembling it.

McCollum often borrows the firearms from auction houses, most commonly the Rock Island Auction and Morphy Auctions. He has also examined and disassembled firearms held in the collections of the Royal Armouries, the French Gendarmerie, Springfield Armory, Heckler & Koch and SAKO among other institutions. He is the author of articles for Popular Mechanics and books on the topic of firearms. He has also collaborated with other YouTubers, museums and firearms experts such as C&Rsenal, Polenar Tactical, TFB TV, Keeper of Firearms and Artillery of the Royal Armouries Jonathan Ferguson and the Nationaal Militair Museum.

== Platforms ==
McCollum avoids political topics in favor of exclusively covering technical topics and history. As of November 2025, he has amassed over 3 million subscribers on YouTube. Despite this, McCollum encountered some difficulties with YouTube deleting his videos, which is why he began uploading his videos to Full30 and Floatplane.

In 2014, McCollum improved the quality of his videos by means of an IndieGogo campaign, the proceeds of which were used to purchase high-quality camera equipment.

In 2018, McCollum co-founded Headstamp Publishing with colleagues N.R. Jenzen-Jones (of Armament Research Services) and James Rupley, through which he wrote and published his book Chassepot to FAMAS. The book was crowdfunded on Kickstarter, and raised $800,256. Headstamp's second book, Thorneycroft to SA80: British Bullpup Firearms, 1901–2020, authored by Jonathan Ferguson, raised $579,585 on Kickstarter. McCollum's second book, Pistols of the Warlords, raised $1,541,381 on Kickstarter.

In addition to his work on firearms, McCollum also has a separate scuba-diving channel, Deep Dive with Ian, where he explores diving related topics.

== See also ==
- List of YouTube personalities
