= The 'Broomhandle' Mauser =

2017 non-fiction book by Jonathan Ferguson

- Author: Jonathan Ferguson
- Language: English
- Genre: Firearm history
- Published: October 19, 2017
- Publisher: Osprey Publishing
- Pages: 80
- ISBN: 9781472816153

The 'Broomhandle' Mauser is a 2017 non-fiction book about the history and design of the Mauser C96 semi-automatic pistol. Written by Jonathan Ferguson, it is the 58th book in the 'Weapon' series by Osprey Publishing.

== Content ==
The 'Broomhandle' Mauser details the development, usage, and impact of the Mauser C96, in Germany, its country of origin, and later via unlicensed foreign copies. The book is heavily illustrated, as Ferguson, who works at the Royal Armouries Museum, was able to photograph C96s from the museum.

== Reception ==
Cybermodeler Online called the book a "riveting little read", and said the part on foreign copies was "among the book's most fascinating sections." Gun Mart also praised the book, stating that "the text and photographs are excellent and the diagrams will really please the firearm collector and historian."

The Firearm Blog noted an error – the book mentions that Turkish C96s used Persian markings, when they were actually in Arabic. Furthermore, they lamented the absence of a section on the collector's market for the pistol, but nonetheless concluded their review by saying "if you are a student of the First World War or early 20th Century small arms, want to get a gift for someone who is, or are simply more curious about this German steampunk handgun, then I would absolutely recommend this Osprey Weapons Series book for you."
