= Hickok45 =

Firearms YouTuber

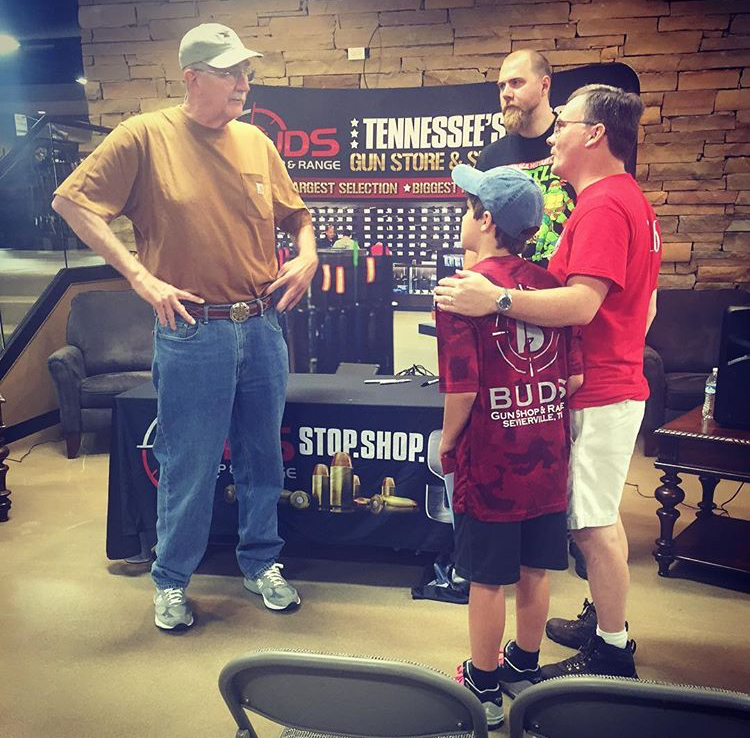
- Kinman (left) and his son John (rear) in 2016
- Born: Greg Kinman; 1950 (age 75–76)

YouTube information
- Channel: Hickok45
- Years active: 2007–present
- Genre: Firearms/Weaponry
- Subscribers: 8.13 million
- Views: 2.44 billion
- Last updated: July 5, 2026

Greg Kinman (born 1950) known online as Hickok45, is an American YouTuber who films videos about firearms.

== Videos ==
Hickok45's videos demonstrate a wide variety of firearms, both historic and modern, and typically present an in-depth discussion of the history and functionality of each firearm. His early videos often showed him shooting Old West weaponry and wearing cowboy outfits. Over time, he expanded his presentations to include a greater variety of firearms, while emphasizing safety. He tends to prefer Glock pistols over those of other manufacturers. While most videos feature Greg, with his son John filming, John has occasionally appeared in videos as well.

Hickok45 became famous for his early videos in which he used pumpkins, watermelons, two-liter soda bottles, and flowerpots for target practice, and cut down saplings and Christmas trees using various guns. These videos have appeared in media in Vietnam, France, India, and Germany.

In 2010, Jay Leno showed a Hickok45 pumpkin carving video on The Tonight Show.

== Personal life ==
Kinman is a 1968 graduate of Boone County High School in Florence, Kentucky, and initially attended Brevard College in North Carolina on a basketball scholarship. He subsequently transferred to Austin Peay State University in Clarksville, Tennessee, where he played center position on the college basketball team for two seasons, 1970–71 and 1971–72. He decided to forgo his senior season as he felt that basketball would not become his profession; he also noted that he was unable to gain weight. College sports records indicate his height as 6 feet 9 inches (2.06 m). He gave his height as 6 feet 8 inches in a video by Demolition Ranch.

Kinman is a retired English teacher. In 2015, he was featured in a webinar by the Sonoran Desert Institute, a for-profit distance learning organization.

Kinman is a former member of the National Rifle Association. He left due to objections with how they were using donor money.

== See also ==
- FPSRussia
- Forgotten Weapons
- List of YouTube personalities
