= History of the firearm =

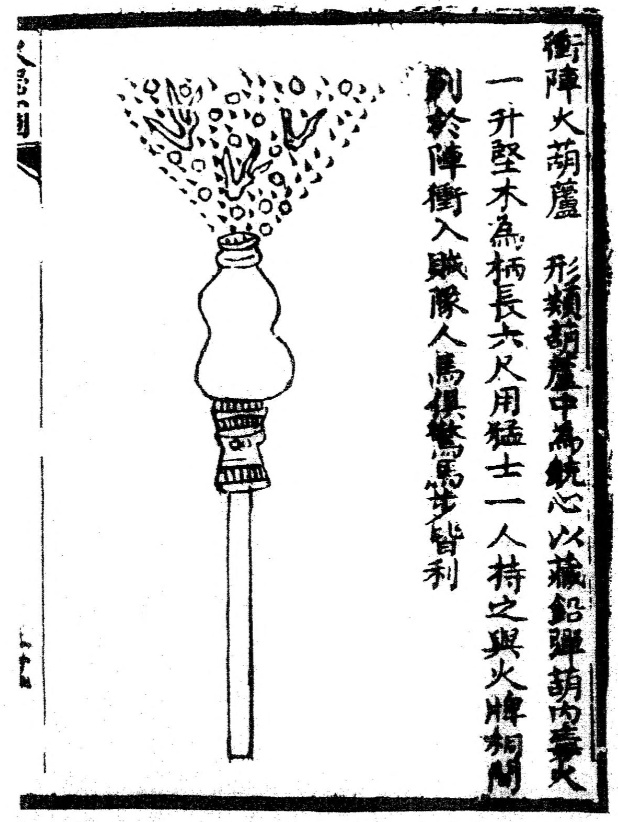
The phalanx-charging fire-gourd, one of many hand cannon types discharging lead pellets in the gunpowder blast, an illustration from the Huolongjing, 14th century.

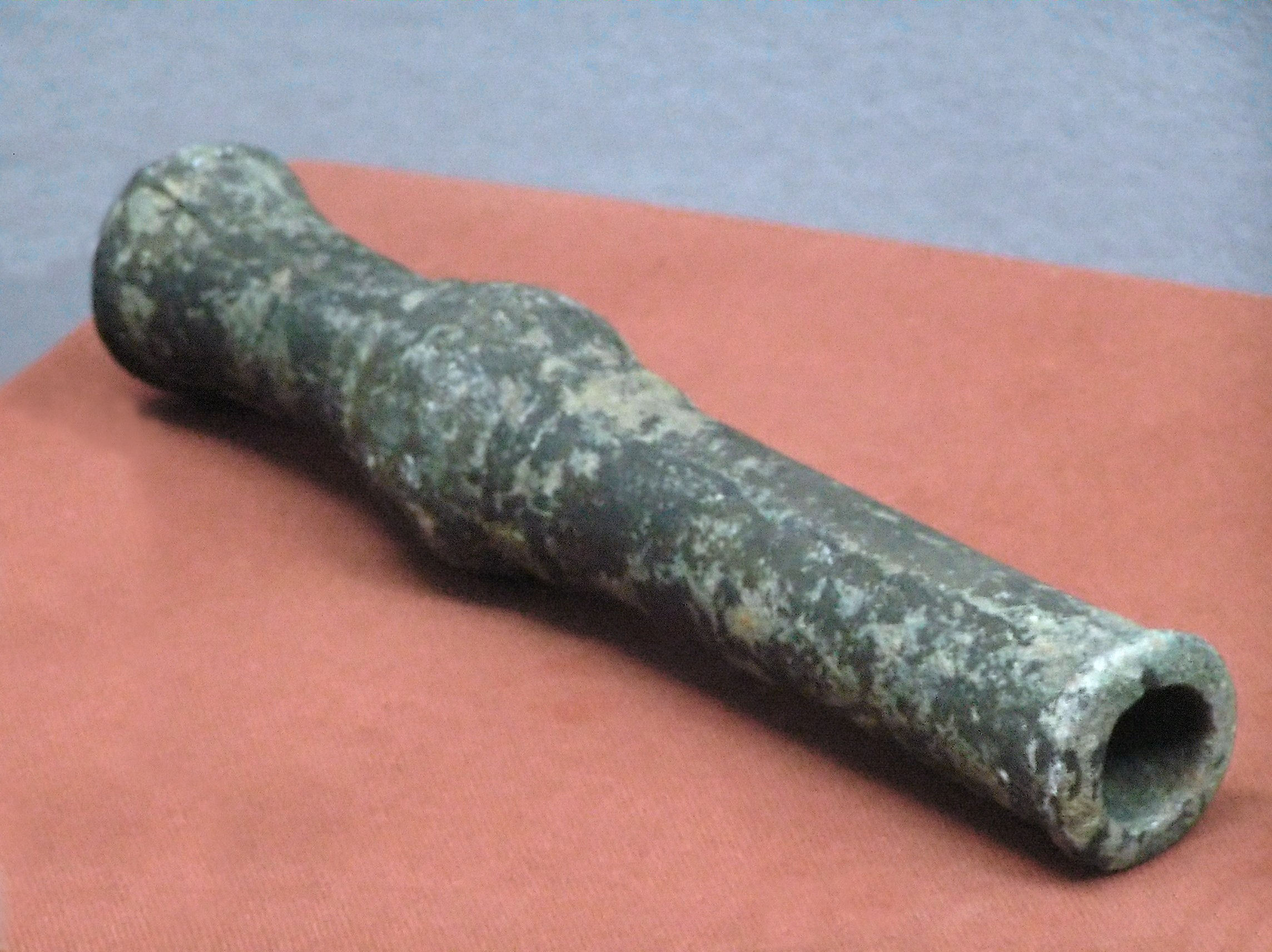
Hand cannon from the Yuan Dynasty (1271–1368).

The history of the firearm begins in 10th-century China, when tubes containing gunpowder projectiles were mounted on spears to make portable fire lances. Over the following centuries, the design evolved into various types, including portable firearms such as flintlocks and blunderbusses, and fixed cannons, and by the 15th century the technology had spread through all of Eurasia. Firearms were instrumental in the fall of the Byzantine Empire and the establishment of European colonization in the Americas, Africa, and Oceania. The 19th and 20th centuries saw an acceleration in this evolution, with the introduction of the magazine, belt-fed weapons, metal cartridges, rifled barrels, and automatic firearms, including machine guns.

Older firearms typically used black powder as a propellant, but modern firearms use smokeless powder or other propellants.

There are reports of some sort of incendiary chemical weapon, the Greek fire, used by the Eastern Roman Empire (Byzantine Empire) from the 7th through the 14th centuries, which may have been delivered through grenades and/or by some kind of flamethrower. However, its nature is still being debated, and it does not seem related to ancient Chinese or modern firearms.

== 10th to 12th centuries ==
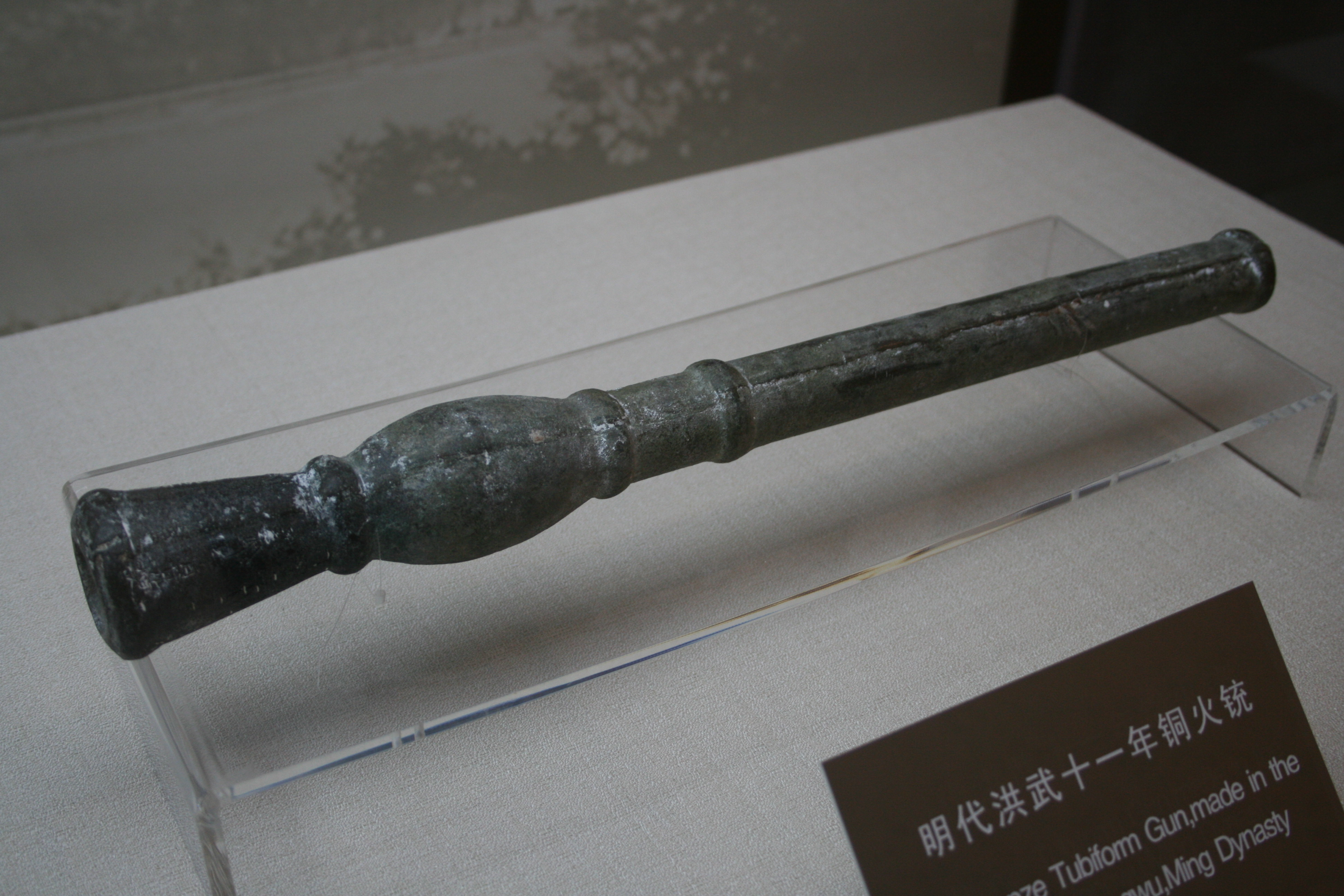
Hand cannon, Ming dynasty, 1379

The first firearms were invented in China, following the invention of gunpowder. The earliest known depiction of a gunpowder weapon is the illustration of a fire lance on a mid-10th century silk banner from Dunhuang. The fire lance was a tube, made of paper and bamboo, filled with black-powder and attached to the end of a spear, which was used as a flamethrower. Shrapnel or pellets were sometimes placed in the barrel so that they would fly out together with the flames. The De'an Shoucheng Lu, an account of the siege of De'an in 1132 during the Jin–Song Wars, records that Song forces used fire-lances against the Jurchen.

The earliest depiction of a gun is a sculpture from a cave in Sichuan dating to the 12th century. It depicts a Chinese figure carrying a vase-shaped bombard with flames and a cannonball emerging from it.

The proportion of saltpeter in the propellant was increased to maximize its power. To better withstand that power, fire lance barrels were made of metal. At the same time, the shrapnel was replaced by projectiles whose size and shape filled the barrel more completely. The result was the hand cannon, with a metal barrel, high-nitrate gunpowder, and a properly sized projectile.

== 13th century ==
The oldest surviving firearm is the Heilongjiang hand cannon dated to 1288, which was discovered in modern-day Acheng District where the History of Yuan records that battles were fought. Li Ting, a military commander of Jurchen descent, led foot soldiers armed with hand cannons to suppress the rebellion of the Eastern Christian Mongol Prince Nayan.

Kublai Khan's mostly failed invasion of Vietnam and of Java (1258–1288) may have spread the knowledge of making gunpowder-based weapons to Southeast Asia. There is evidence of that knowledge in the Nusantara archipelago. A stele inscription by Trương Hán Siêu dated to 1312 recorded guns and shots ("súng đạn") among the loot that the Vietnamese obtained from the Chams in a campaign. It indicates that both polities had knowledge of guns and even employed them well before that date.

Ahmad Y. al-Hassan claimed that the Battle of Ain Jalut in 1260 pitted the Bahri Mamluks against the Mongol Empire. "The first cannon in history" used gunpowder almost identical with the ideal composition for explosive gunpowder. However, Iqtidar Alam Khan argued that it was the invading Mongols who introduced gunpowder to the Islamic world and cites Mamluk antagonism towards early riflemen as an example of how gunpowder weapons were not always accepted.

== 14th and 15th centuries ==
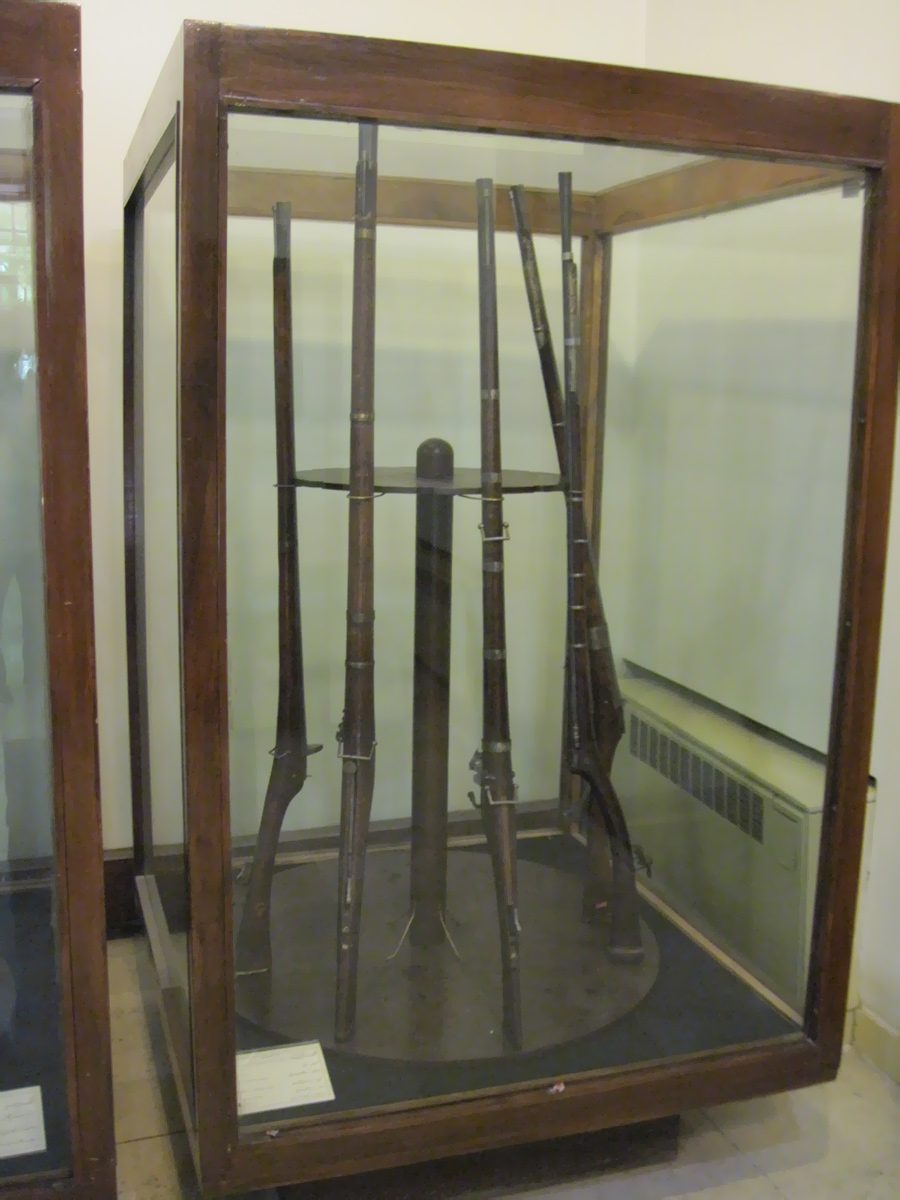
Guns of Safavid Iran

Firearms appeared in the Middle East between the late 13th and early 14th century.

The first references to what may have been arquebuses (Ottoman Turkish: tüfek) made by the Janissary corps of the Ottoman military date them to between 1394 and 1465. However, by as late as 1444, it is unclear whether these were truly arquebuses or rather small cannons. The fact that they were listed separately from cannons in mid-15th century inventories suggests that they were handheld firearms.

The musket first appeared in the Ottoman Empire by 1465. In the Shen Qi Pu (神器譜), a firearms manual written in 1598, Chinese firearm designer and writer Zhao Shi Zhen described Turkish muskets as superior to European muskets. At some point before 1598, Turks developed a pivoting matchlock mechanism that was later modified by Zhao into the first mechanism using rack and pinion.

One major obstacle preventing matchlock guns from large-scale adoption was complaints that strong wind and rain could either blow away or ruin priming powder placed in the flash pan. Mentioned in Shen Qi Pu, Zhao later developed the "Xuanyuan arquebus" (Chinese: 軒轅銃, romanized: Xuānyuan-chòng, named for the Yellow Emperor), which used a novel rack-and-pinion mechanism. This firing mechanism was connected to both the serpentine and flash pan cover and designed so that whenever the trigger is pulled, the serpentine was lowered at the same time as flash pan cover opened, minimizing the priming powder's exposure to open air and thus reducing the risk of priming powder being blown away by strong wind or spoiled by rain. The combination of a trigger-operated flash pan cover and small copper rain cover mounted on a pendulum was considered a more sophisticated approach to the Japanese solution of covering the entire firing mechanism with a lacquered box, which could hamper aiming, shooting and reloading. The Chinese military book Wubei Zhi (1621) describes Turkish muskets that used similar rack and pinion mechanisms, which were not known to have been used in European firearms at the time.

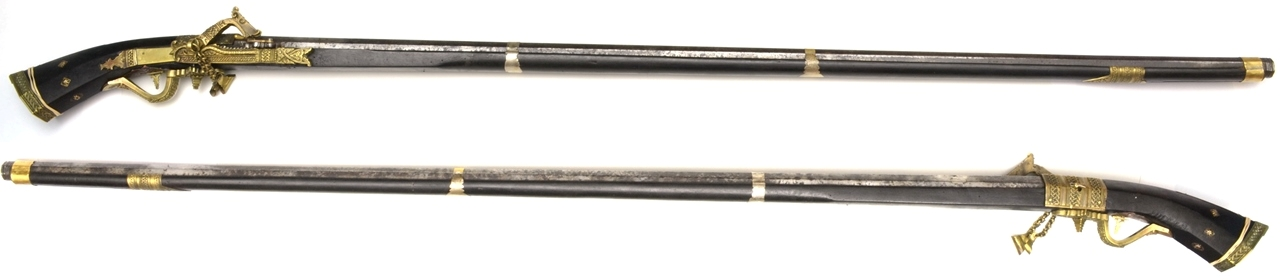
Istinggar, a result of Indo-Portuguese gun-making traditions.

A pole gun, the bedil tombak, was recorded in Java in 1413, The knowledge of making "true" firearms came after the middle of the 15th century. It was probably brought by Arab traders no earlier than 1460. Before the arrival of the Portuguese in Southeast Asia, primitive firearms in the form of the Java arquebus was already present.

The technology further improved after the Portuguese capture of Malacca (1511). Starting in 1513, German, Bohemian and Turkish gun-making traditions merged. This resulted in the Indo-Portuguese tradition of making matchlocks. Indian craftsmen modified the design by introducing a short, almost pistol-like buttstock held against the cheek, not the shoulder, when aiming. They reduced the caliber and made the gun lighter and more balanced. The Portuguese, who conducted much fighting aboard ships and rivercraft, valued a more compact gun, and thus this approach became popular. Malay gun founders, regarded to be on the same level as German gunsmiths by the Portuguese, quickly adapted these new firearms and birthed a new type of arquebus, the istinggar.

== South Asia ==
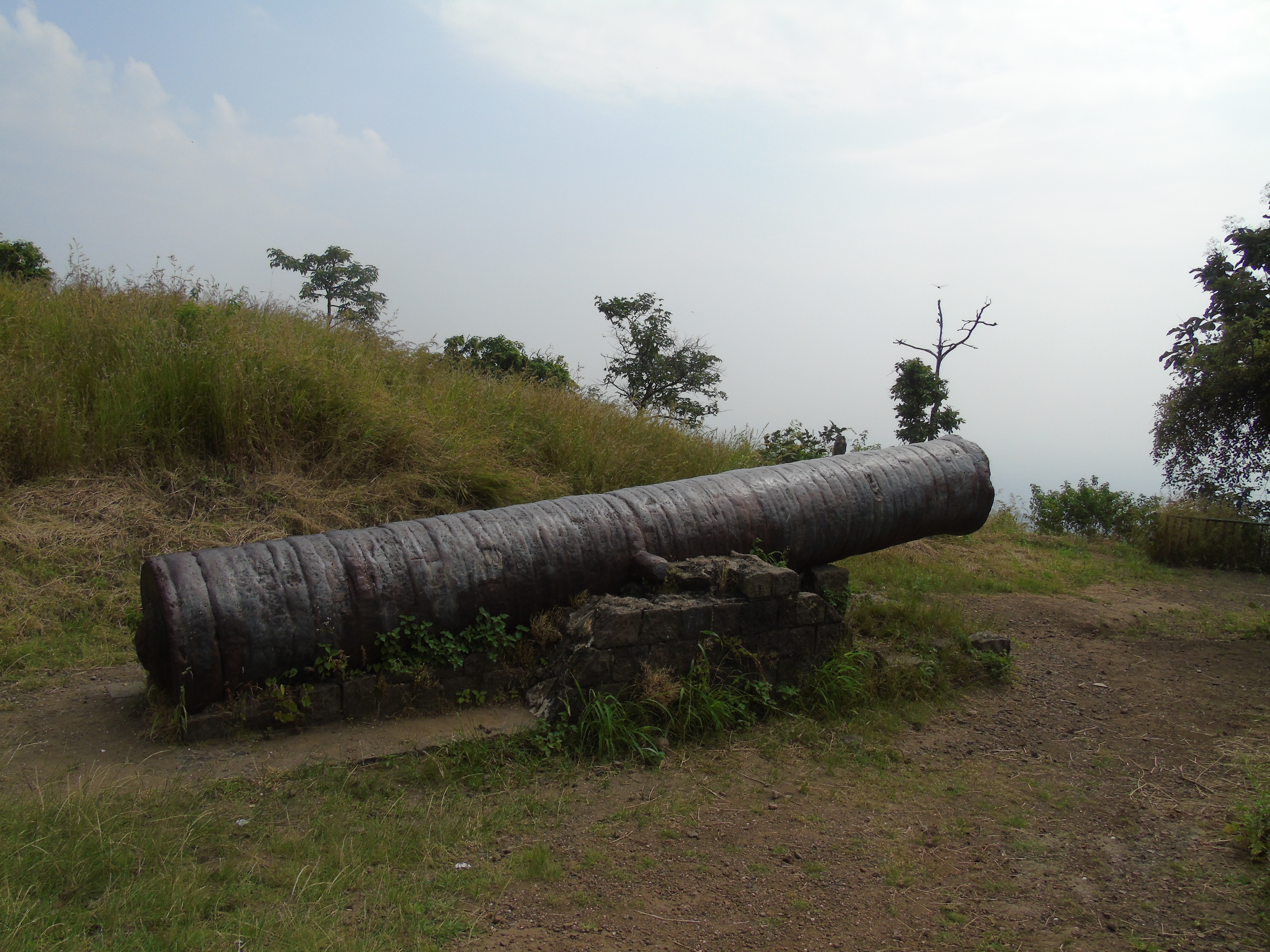
Nau Gaj Cannon, the third largest cannon in India at Narnala fort.

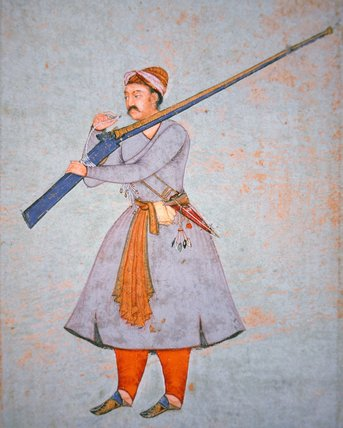
Mughal Officer in 1585, holding a Toradar.

The first recorded use of firearms in South Asia was at the Battle of Adoni in 1368. In the Deccans, the Bahmani sultanate led by Mohammed Shah I used a train of artillery against the Vijayanagara Empire under Harihara II. The first recorded firearms in Đại Việt were used against the Champa king Chế Bồng Nga in 1390. He was killed by a volley of cannons known in Chinese as Huochong; one cannonball blasted through the ship planks before hitting the king, killing him instantly. Their use by Sultan Mohammed Shah of Gujarat in the fifteenth century was recorded. When the Portuguese reached India in 1498, they brought with them firearms, among them the matchlock musket and man-of-war (ships) armed with cannons. Portuguese travelers observed that firearms there were already in use. Peasants of the Gangetic plains used cheap handguns made by local blacksmiths. Travancore, Kashmir, Rajasthan, Punjab and Sindh hosted sites of arms manufacture. In the early 16th century, Zamorin of Calicut, had begun to emulate the Portuguese and began to arm his ships with naval gun pieces, combining local and imported technology.

In the 16th century, Central Asian prince Babur, the first Mughal emperor, brought Turkish firearms, which Mughal adversaries used against the Delhi Sultanate in the First Battle of Panipat, which the Rajputs and the Afghans in turn adopted. Across the 16th and 17th century, firearms played an important role in the Mughal military. Known as the tufang, Mughal emperor Akbar introduced many improvements in the matchlock.

Firearms were also developed by the Marathas, although weaker than their counterparts such as the Mughals and Mysore. Balaji Baji Rao organised the arm in professional lines and Madhavji Sindhia established a more efficient gun foundry under the supervision of European gun makers. During the 18th century, Tipu Sultan was notable for effective use of guns, mortar, rockets and howitzers; the Nizam of Hyderabad manufactured guns with the help of French officers, while Sikhs under Maharaja Ranjit Singh pioneered the development of horse-artillery on the same lines as that of the East India Company.

== Europe ==
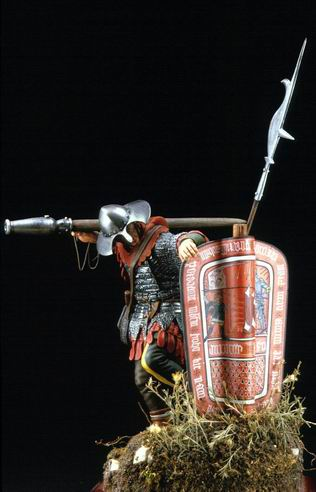
A model of a Hussite warrior behind a Pavise shield, carrying a píšťala on his arm

One theory of how gunpowder came to Europe is via the Silk Road; another holds that it arrived during the Mongol invasion in the first half of the 13th century. English Privy Wardrobe accounts list ribaldis, a type of cannon, in the 1340s, and siege guns were used by the English at the Siege of Calais (1346–47).

The first mention of firearms in Russia is found in the Sofiiskii vremennik chronicle, which stated that during the 1382 defense of Moscow from Tokhtamysh's Golden Horde, Muscovites used firearms called tyufyaki (Russian: тюфяки), which were of Eastern origin; this word derives from Turkic tüfäk "gun".

Around the late 14th century in Italy, smaller, portable hand-cannons or schioppi were developed, creating in effect the first smoothbore personal firearm. The earliest surviving firearm in Europe was found in Otepää, Estonia. It dates to at least 1396.

Firearms evolved during the 1419-1434 Hussite Wars. The Hussite army consisted mostly of civilian militia who lacked the skill, experience and often weapons and armor comparable to that of the professional Crusader invaders that they faced. Gradually, Hussites pioneered battlefield use of firearms together with war wagons. Firearms were employed in auxiliary roles in 1419–1421. The first use of firearms as primary offensive weapons came in the 1421 Battle of Kutná Hora. From this moment on, firearms formed the core of Hussite tactics as well as a staple of Czech civilian possession. The Hussite militia used a number of handheld firearms, including píšťala, which later found its way through German and French into English as the term pistol, hákovnice, an infantry weapon heavier than píšťala, and yet heavier tarasnic (fauconneau). For artillery, Hussites used the Czech: houfnice, which gave rise to the English term, "howitzer" (houf meaning crowd for its intended use of shooting stone and iron shot against massed enemy forces), bombarda (mortar) and dělo (cannon). The first English source about handheld firearms discussed hand cannons in 1473. In the late 15th century, the Ottoman Empire used firearms as part of its regular infantry. The earliest type of Turkish hand cannons are called Şakaloz, after the Hungarian hand cannon Szakállas puska in the 15th century.

=== Early modern age ===
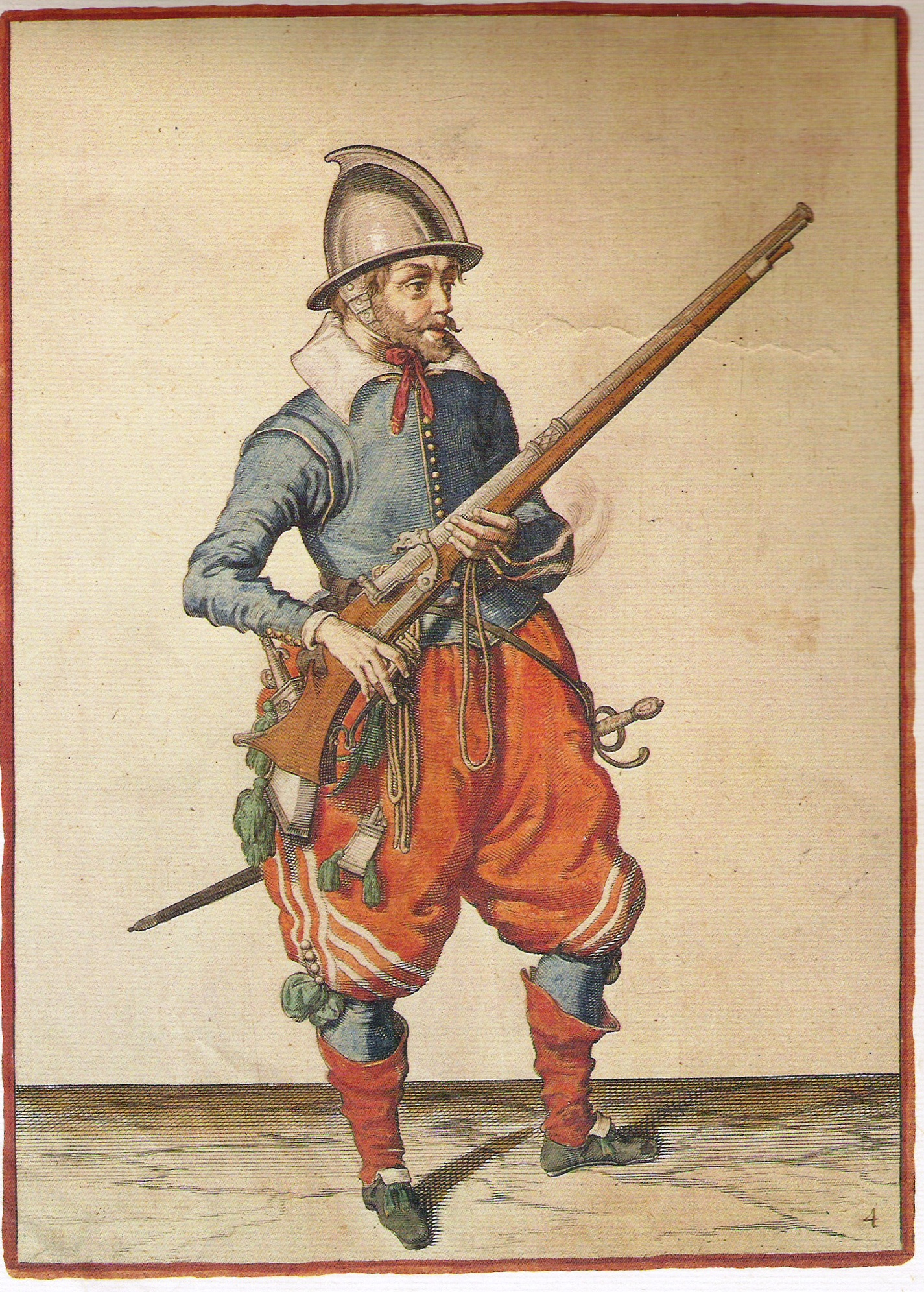
Page showing a musketeer (Plate 4) from Jacob de Gheyn's Wapenhandelinghe van Roers, Musquetten ende Spiessen (1608)

During the early modern age, hand-held cannons evolved into the matchlock, wheellock, doglock, and flintlock rifle, respectively, as ignition devices, matchlocks, wheellocks, snaplock, flintlocks and percussion caps were used in turn. This was then followed by the breech loader and finally the automatic weapon. The paper cartridge was introduced sometime before 1586, and the bayonet came to use in 16th century France. Hand grenades, thrown by grenadiers, appeared around the same time.

Early cartridge firearms had to be cocked and caught by the "sear", which holds the hammer back, before each shot. Pulling the trigger allows the hammer or striker to fly forward, striking the "firing pin," which then strikes the "primer," igniting an impact-sensitive chemical compound (historically, first fulminate of mercury, then potassium chlorate, now lead styphnate) which shoots a flame through the "flash hole" into the cartridge's propellant chamber, igniting the propellant.

The Springfield Armory in Springfield, Massachusetts became important during the 1850s, when it debuted the Springfield rifle. Springfield rifles were among the first breech-loading rifles, starting production in 1865. By that time, metallurgy had developed sufficiently so that brass could be made into ammunition cases. Previously, each round was custom-made as needed: the shooter poured loose powder down the barrel, used leather or cloth for wadding if time allowed, selected a suitable projectile (lead ball, rocks, arrow, or nails), then seated the projectile on top of the powder charge by means of a ramrod. Performance was erratic. Fixed ammunition combined a primer, the pre-measured charge, and the projectile in a water-resistant brass cartridge case. Most importantly, the soft brass expanded under pressure of the gas to seal the rear end of the barrel, which prevented the shooter from being maimed by escaping high-pressure gas when they pulled the trigger.

=== Repeating and automatic firearms ===
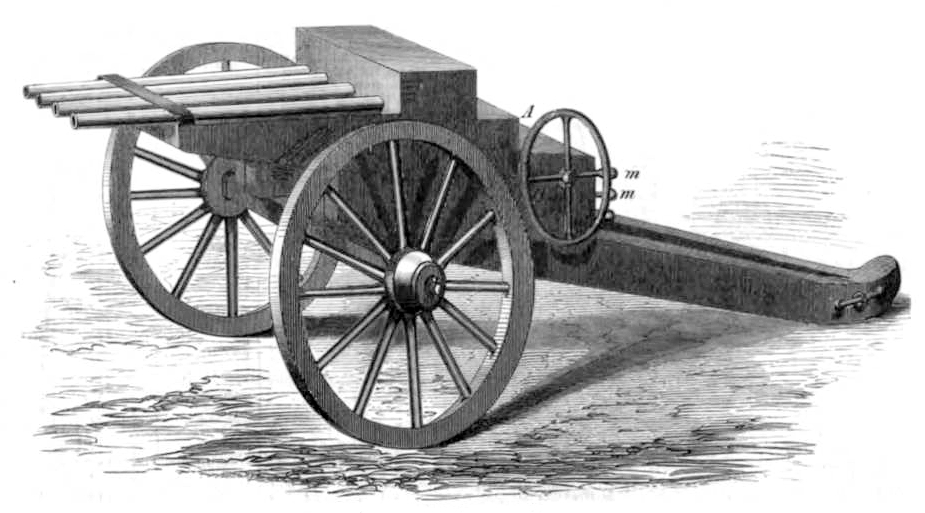
Field machine gun

A repeating firearm, ("repeater") can hold multiple cartridges and be fired multiple times before reloading. Repeaters employ a variety of mechanisms for readying a bullet for firing. This typically involves ejecting a used cartridge and moving a new one into the firing chamber. Mechanisms include bolt-action, lever-action, slide-action, semi-automatic, and fully-automatic firearms. Automatic weapons cycle a new round into the firing chamber without the help of the shooter. Semi-automatics fire one round per trigger pull. Full automatics fire multiple rounds per pull.

==== Revolvers ====
Revolvers hold cartridges in a rotating cylinder, which serves as both a magazine and firing chamber. They were the earliest repeaters. Revolving rifles were sometimes called "turret guns". Single action revolvers were fired after manually cocking the hammer for each shot. This design dates from at least 1836, with the introduction of the Colt Paterson. Double-action revolvers emerged around the same time. They can be fired after cocking the hammer, but also by pulling the trigger without first cocking it. Double-action only or DAO revolvers can be fired only using the trigger.

The Springfield Model 1892–99 was used during the Spanish–American War.

==== Self-loaders ====
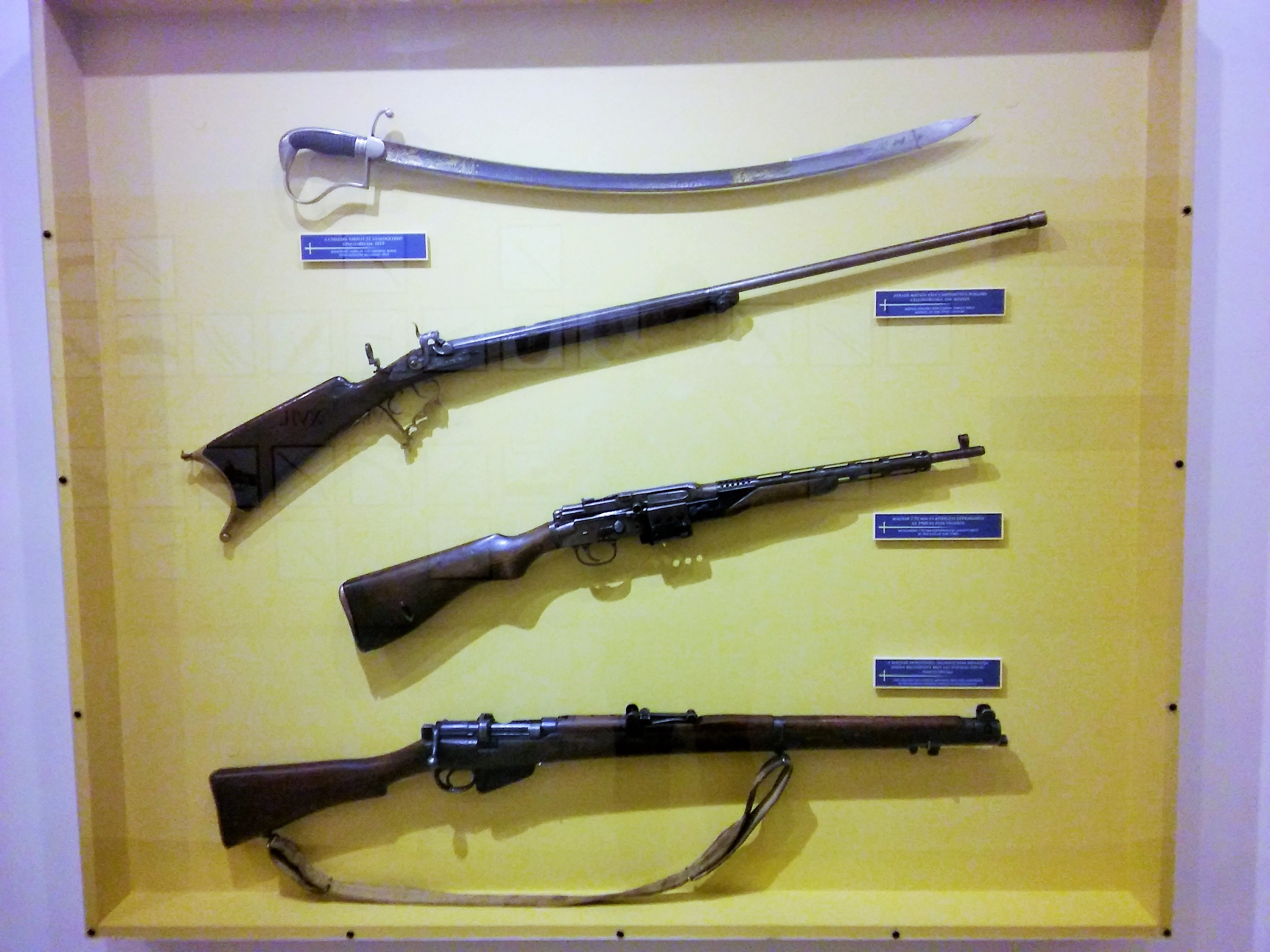
Hungarian prototype 7.92x33mm Assault Rifle prototype compared to flintlock and Lee-Enfield bolt action rifle at the Hadtörténeti Múzeum Budapest

The first successful self-loader was the Gatling gun, a hand-cranked revolver. It was invented by Richard Jordan Gatling and fielded by the Union forces during the American Civil War. Self-loaders use energy to reload. The world's first machine gun was the Maxim gun, developed by British inventor Sir Hiram Maxim in 1884.

The world's first successful self-loading rifle was the Mondragón rifle, designed in 1908 by Mexican general Manuel Mondragón. It was the first self-loading firearm able to be operated by one person. It was used during the Mexican Revolution (Mexican Army) and World War I (Imperial German Flying Corps).

The first submachine gun, which fires pistol cartridges and can be used by one soldier, was the MP18.1, invented by Theodor Bergmann. It was introduced in 1918 by the German Army as the primary weapon of the Stosstruppen (assault groups specialized in trench combat). During World War II well-crafted versions such as the Thompson were replaced by mass-produced alternatives, such as the M3.

The first successful assault rifle was the StG 44, introduced during World War II by the Germans. It was the first firearm to occupy the gap between rifles and submachine guns. The assault rifle was more powerful and had longer range than the submachine gun, but was less powerful and shorter range than standard rifles. It used intermediate size rounds as well and offered select-fire option (switch from full automatic to semi-automatic). The AK-47, commonly known as the "Kalashnikov", is the most manufactured assault rifle.

The battle rifle was a select-fire rifle that retained the long range of the M1 Garand. NATO members adopted battle rifles of their own. In practice, the powerful cartridge of the battle rifle proved to be difficult to control during fully automatic fire.

== See also ==
- Science and technology of the Song dynasty
- Jiao Yu
- Huolongjing
- History of cannon
- History of weapons
- Military history
- Table of handgun and rifle cartridges
- Gunpowder artillery in the Song dynasty

== Bibliography ==
- Andrade, Tonio (2016). The Gunpowder Age: China, Military Innovation, and the Rise of the West in World History. Princeton University Press. ISBN 978-0-691-13597-7.
- Buchanan, Brenda J. (2006), Gunpowder, Explosives and the State: A Technological History, Aldershot: Ashgate, ISBN 978-0-7546-5259-5
- Chase, Kenneth (2003), Firearms: A Global History to 1700, Cambridge University Press, ISBN 978-0-521-82274-9
- Crosby, Alfred W. (2002), Throwing Fire: Projectile Technology Through History, Cambridge University Press, ISBN 978-0-521-79158-8
- Kelly, Jack (2004), Gunpowder: Alchemy, Bombards & Pyrotechnics: The History of the Explosive that Changed the World, Basic Books, ISBN 978-0-465-03718-6
- Needham, Joseph (1986), Science & Civilisation in China, vol. V:7: The Gunpowder Epic, Cambridge University Press, ISBN 978-0-521-30358-3
- Norris, John (2003), Early Gunpowder Artillery: 1300-1600, Marlborough: The Crowood Press.
- Richards, John F. (1993). The Mughal Empire. Cambridge University Press. p. 288. ISBN 978-0-521-56603-2.
- Sun Laichen (2006) Chinese Gunpowder Technology Technology and Dai Viet, ca. 1390 -1497. In Vietnam Borderless Histories Eds Nhung Tuyet Tran & Anthony Reid University of Wisconsin Press
