= Fauconneau =

Small type of cannon

A Fauconneau was a small type of cannon used during the Middle Ages and the early Renaissance. A typical fauconneau weighed about 25 kg and had a length of about 1 meter. It was a semi-portable weapon. It was mainly an anti-personnel weapon to be used on fixed fortifications. and was used from the 15th to 16th centuries.

== Gallery ==
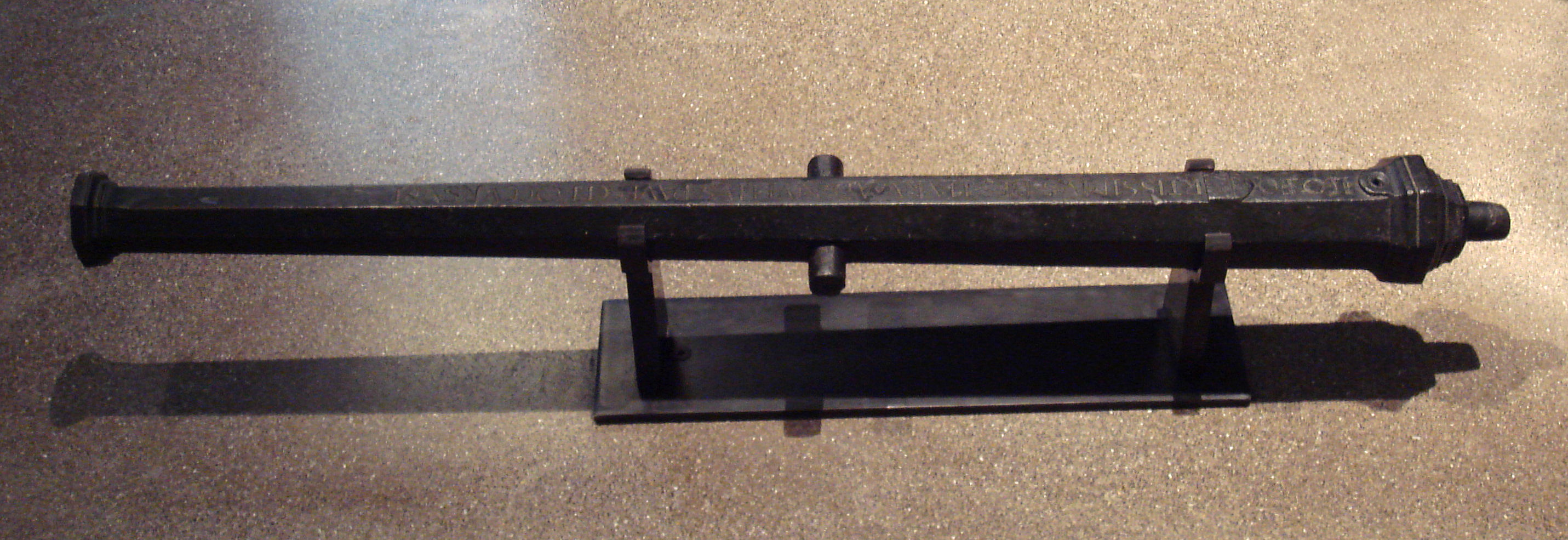
Fauconneau, Musée de l'Armée, Paris. Length: 1.06m, cal 32mm, weight: 25.4kg, iron projectile. c. 1510.

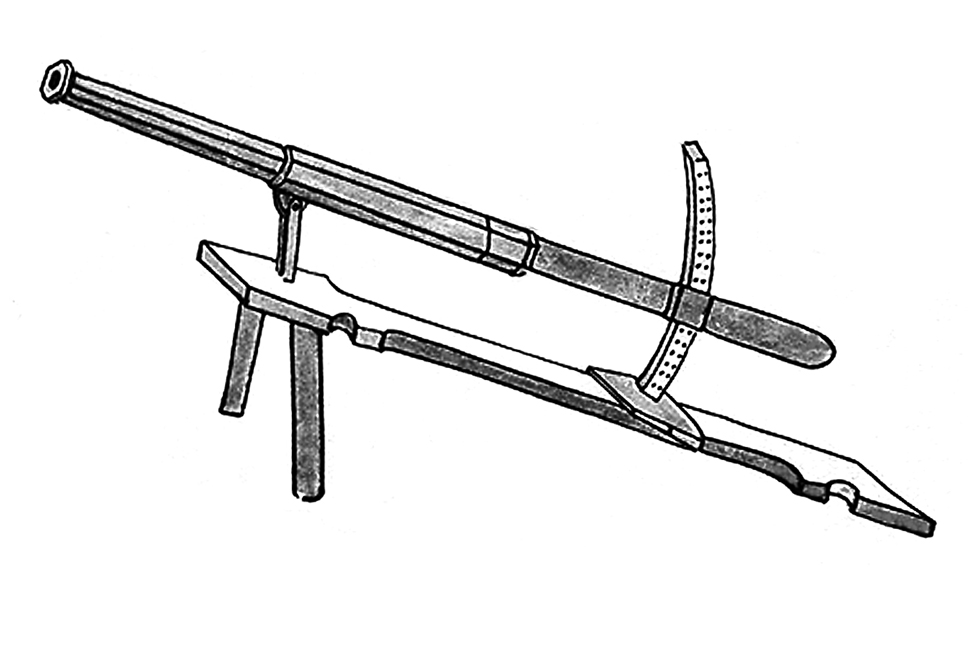
A sketch of a fauconneau with a rack for adjusting the angle of the barrel
