= Jonathan Ferguson =

British firearm historian (born 1979)

- Born: 3 January 1979 (age 47)
- Education: Exeter University (BA); Leicester University (PgD)
- Occupations: Historian; author
- Writing career
- Subject: History of firearms

Jonathan Steven Ferguson (born 3 January 1979) is a British firearm historian and author who is currently the Keeper of Firearms and Artillery at the Royal Armouries Museum in Leeds, England. He is also a technical specialist with Armament Research Services, a consultancy firm.

== Career ==
Ferguson received a Bachelor of Arts degree in archaeology from the University of Exeter in 2000, and a postgraduate diploma in museum studies from the University of Leicester in 2002. He held posts at the Colchester Museum, Imperial War Museum Duxford, and National War Museum of Scotland before joining the Royal Armouries Museum in 2009. He has appeared in two documentaries: Sean Bean on Waterloo (2015) and Sword, Musket & Machine Gun (2017). He was also an interview subject in the mockumentary Cunk on Earth where he was interviewed as an expert on the Colt Single Action Army revolver. Ferguson is also a Technical Specialist with Armament Research Services, a technical intelligence consultancy, as well as associate editor of the Armax journal of contemporary arms.

From 2020 to November 2024, Ferguson appeared on the GameSpot YouTube series titled "Firearms Expert Reacts." In the series, Ferguson analyses depictions of firearms from video games such as Escape from Tarkov, Call of Duty: Black Ops Cold War, Insurgency: Sandstorm, and Cyberpunk 2077, and compares their design and function against their real-life counterparts using pieces from the Royal Armouries' collection. In 2021, Ferguson began a series on the Royal Armouries' official YouTube channel in which he explains the history and functionality of select firearms from the Armouries. In 2025, after GameSpot discontinued "Expert Reacts," Ferguson, host Dave Jewitt, and other regular series guests started their own YouTube channel named EXP, to continue creating similar content, expanding to movies and television as well.

== Select bibliography ==
- Thorneycroft to SA80: British Bullpup Firearms, 1901–2020 (Headstamp Publishing, 2020)
- Black & Grey: The Illicit Online Trade of Small Arms in Venezuela (Armament Research Services, 2020)
- An Introductory Guide to the Identification of Small Arms, Light Weapons, and Associated Ammunition (Small Arms Survey, 2018)
- Arms and Armour of the First World War (Royal Armouries, 2018)
- The 'Broomhandle' Mauser (Osprey Publishing, 2017)
- Raising Red Flags: An Examination of Arms & Munitions in the Ongoing Conflict in Ukraine (Armament Research Services, 2014)
