= Wubei Zhi =

Chinese military book

- Traditional Chinese: 武備志
- Simplified Chinese: 武备志
- Literal meaning: military preparation records
Transcriptions
Standard Mandarin
- Hanyu Pinyin: Wǔbèi Zhì

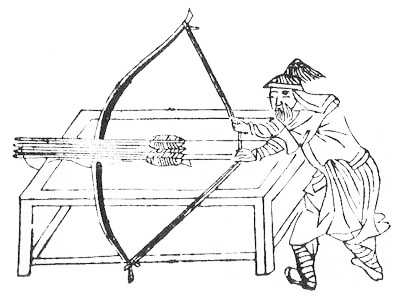
Illustration of a platformed crossbow in the Wubei Zhi

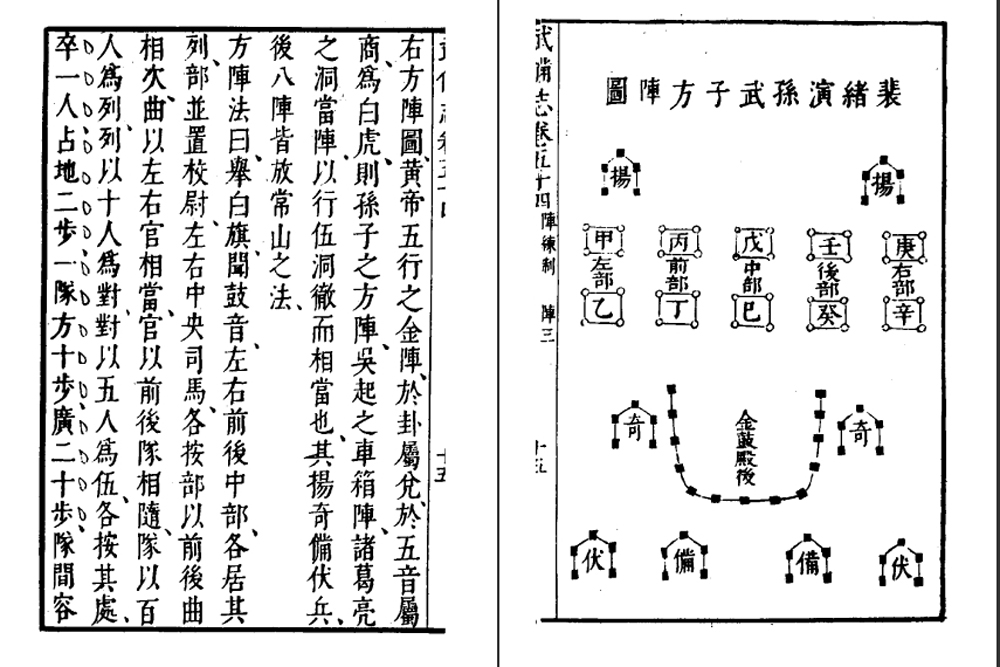
Illustration of a Sun Zi troop formation in Wubei Zhi

The Wubei Zhi (Chinese: 武備志; Treatise on Armament Technology or Records of Armaments and Military Provisions) is a military book in Chinese history. It was compiled in 1621 by Mao Yuanyi (茅元儀 Máo Yuányí; 1594–1640?), an officer of waterborne troops in the Ming dynasty. The Wubei Zhi contains 240 volumes, 10,405 pages, and more than 200,000 Chinese characters.

== Structure ==
Wubei Zhi consists of five sections, "Bing Jue Ping", "Zhan Lue Kao", "Zhen Lian Zhi", "Jun Zi Sheng", and "Zhan Du Zai".

- "Bing Jue Ping" (Commentary on Military Formulae)

Containing 18 chapters, this section includes military theories from significant figures including, but not limited to, Sun Tzu. Some of these theories date back to the last years of the Eastern Zhou dynasty, more than 1,800 years before the editor.

- "Zhan Lue Kao" (Consideration of Tactics)

This section consists of 31 chapters, and describes more than 600 specific examples of battles that took place between the Eastern Zhou dynasty and the Yuan dynasty. Among these are the Battle of Maling and Battle of Red Cliffs, the latter of which is a classic example of defeating an overpowering enemy.

- "Zhen Lian Zhi" (Record of Formations and Training)

This section of the book contains 41 chapters. It contains different methods of training troops, including infantry, cavalry, and chariots, as well as individual martial arts training with different weapons such as the spear and Dao.

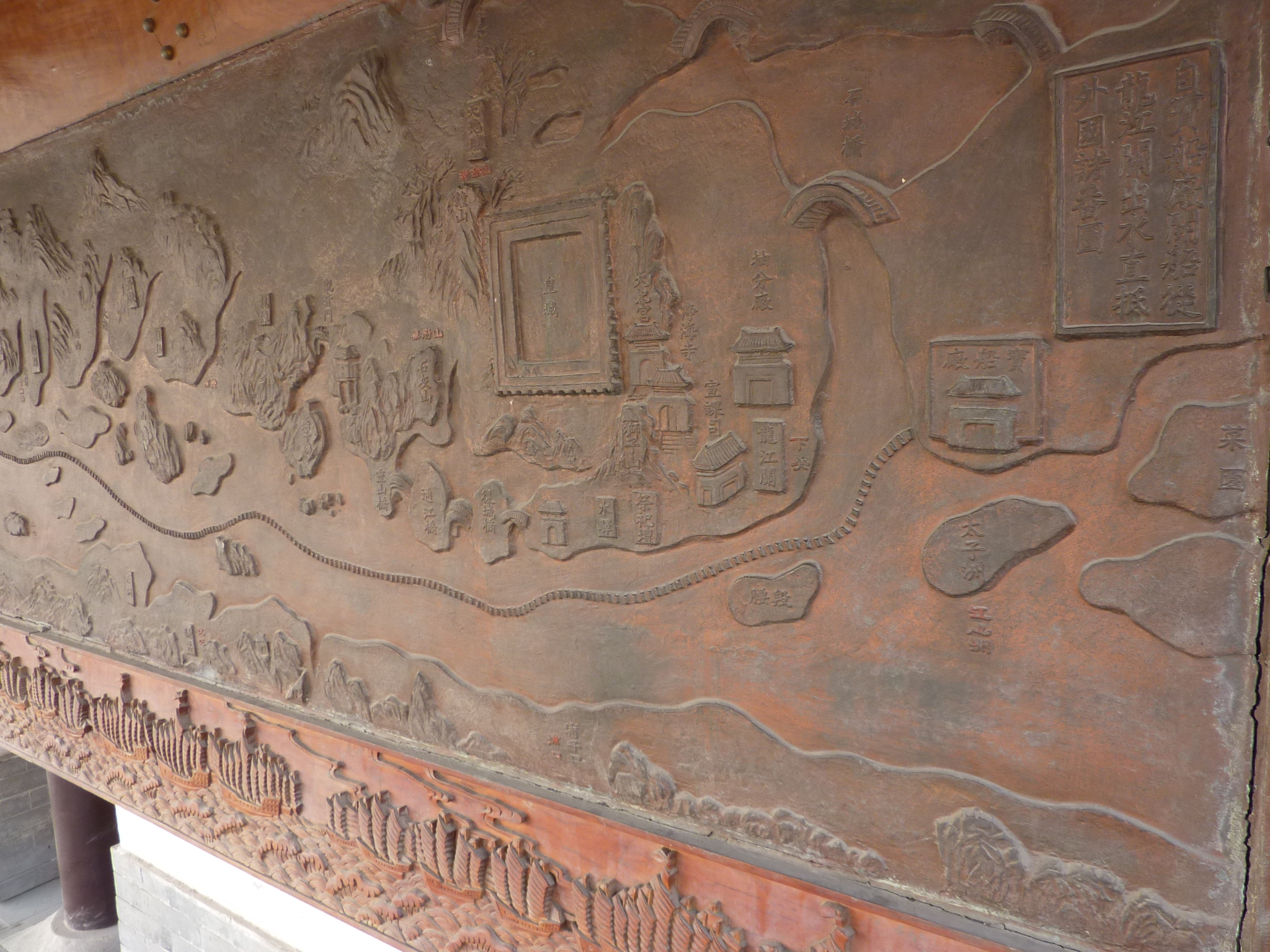
A section of the Mao Kun Map showing the environs of Nanjing, reproduced as a wall relief in the Treasure Boat Shipyard Park, Nanjing

- "Jun Zi Sheng" (Summary of Logistics)

This section is divided into 55 categories, covering a variety of contents related to wartime logistics, such as marching, encampments, troops arrays, transmitting orders, attacking and defending cities, and provision of food, weapons, healthcare, and transportation, among others.

- "Zhan Du Zai"

In this section, which is 96 chapters long, the author discusses aspects of weather and geographic features that are related to combat, as well as traditional Chinese methods of divination, formation, and finally, marine navigation. Included into this section is the so-called "Mao Kun map", the unique surviving map representing the Pacific and Indian Ocean shipping routes used by the fleets of Zheng He.

== Impact ==
Being known as "a military encyclopedia in ancient China", Wubei Zhi is one of the most influential works in Chinese history on warfare. It is a rare source of many maps and weapon designs, and contributed enormously to its various chapters' corresponding areas. It also provides an account of ancient Chinese military theories and Chinese militarists' thoughts.

== Gallery ==
=== Melee weapons ===
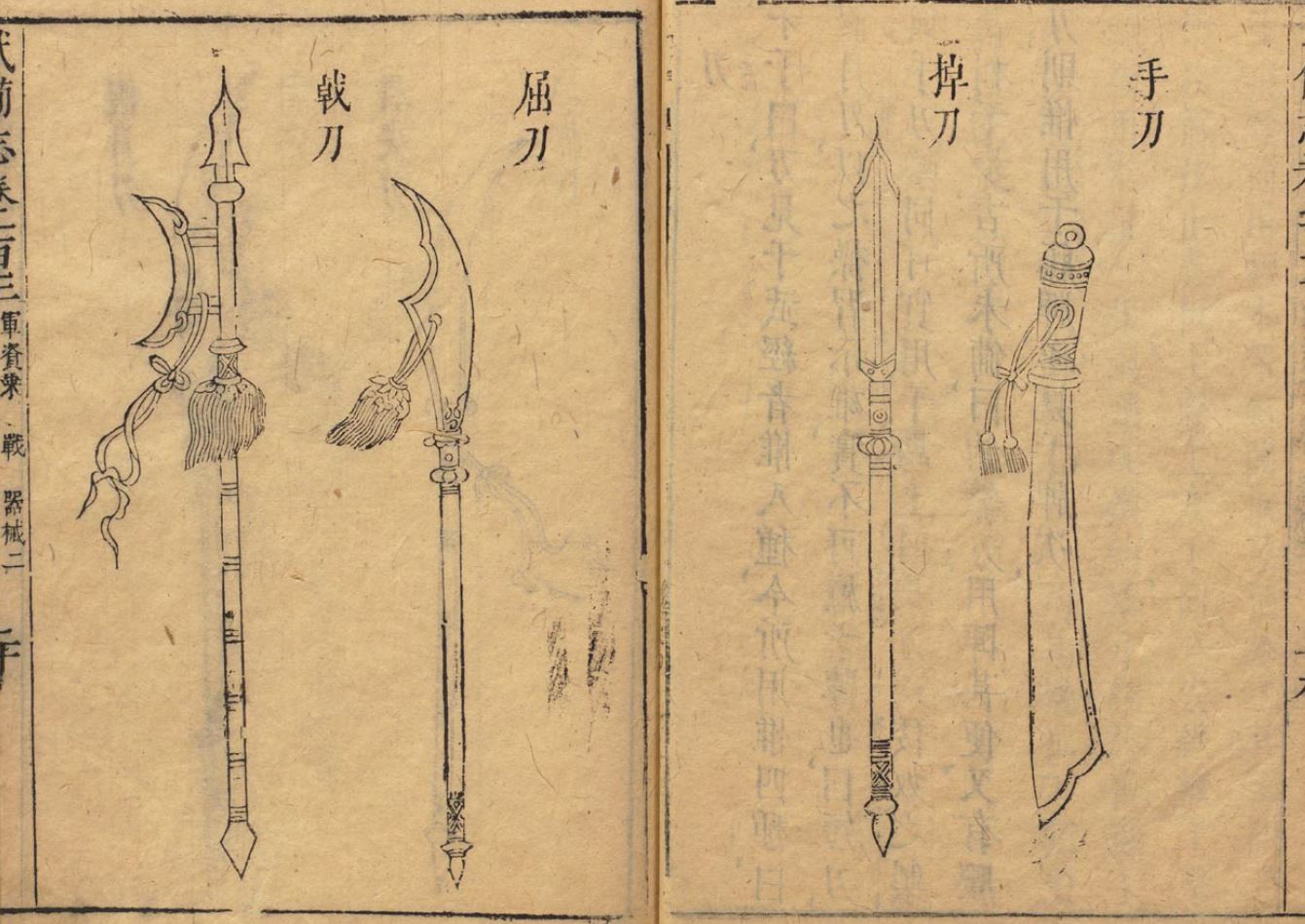

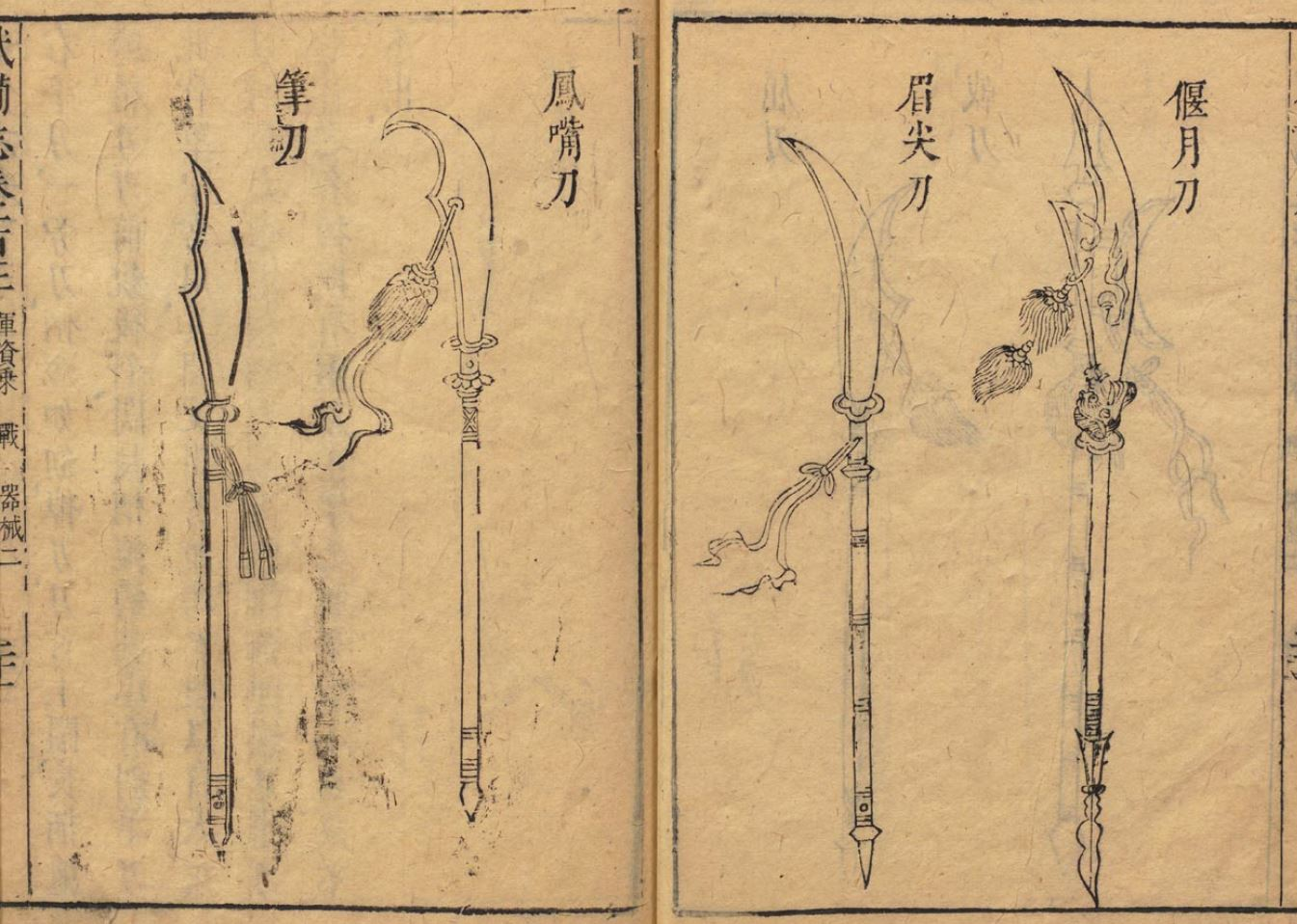

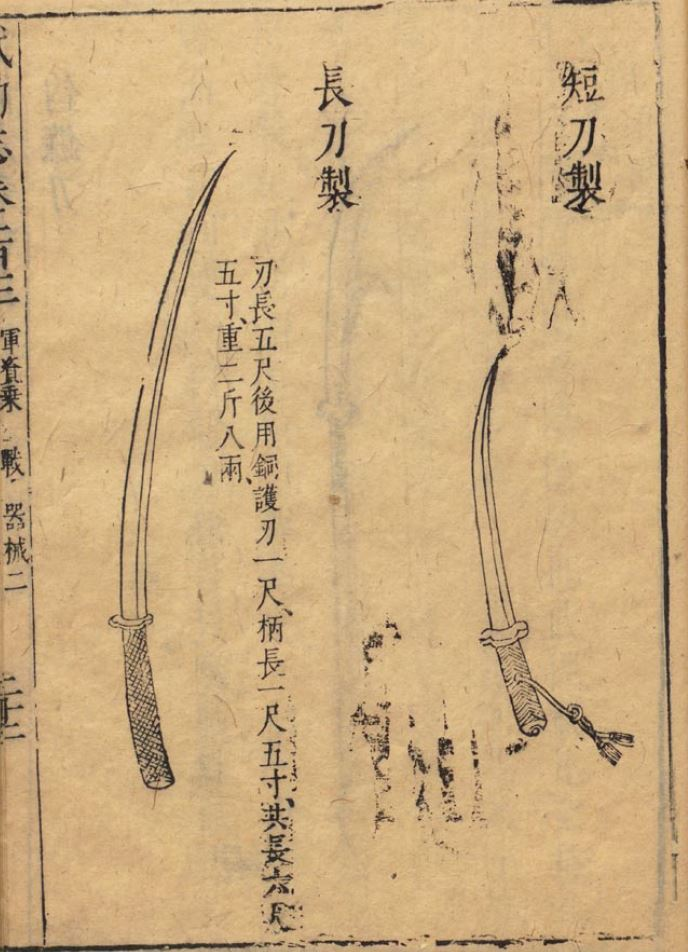

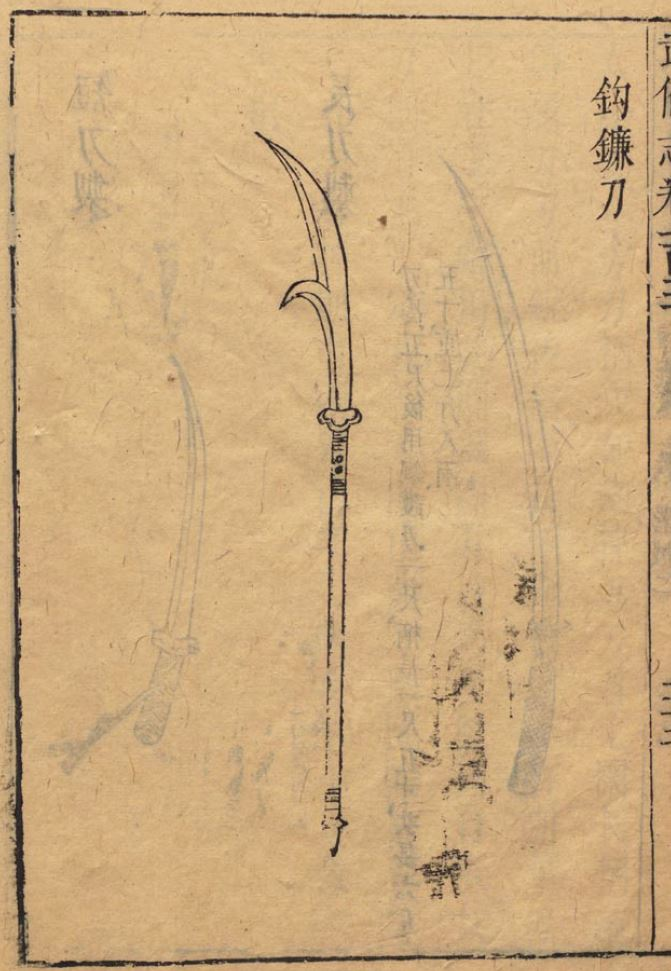

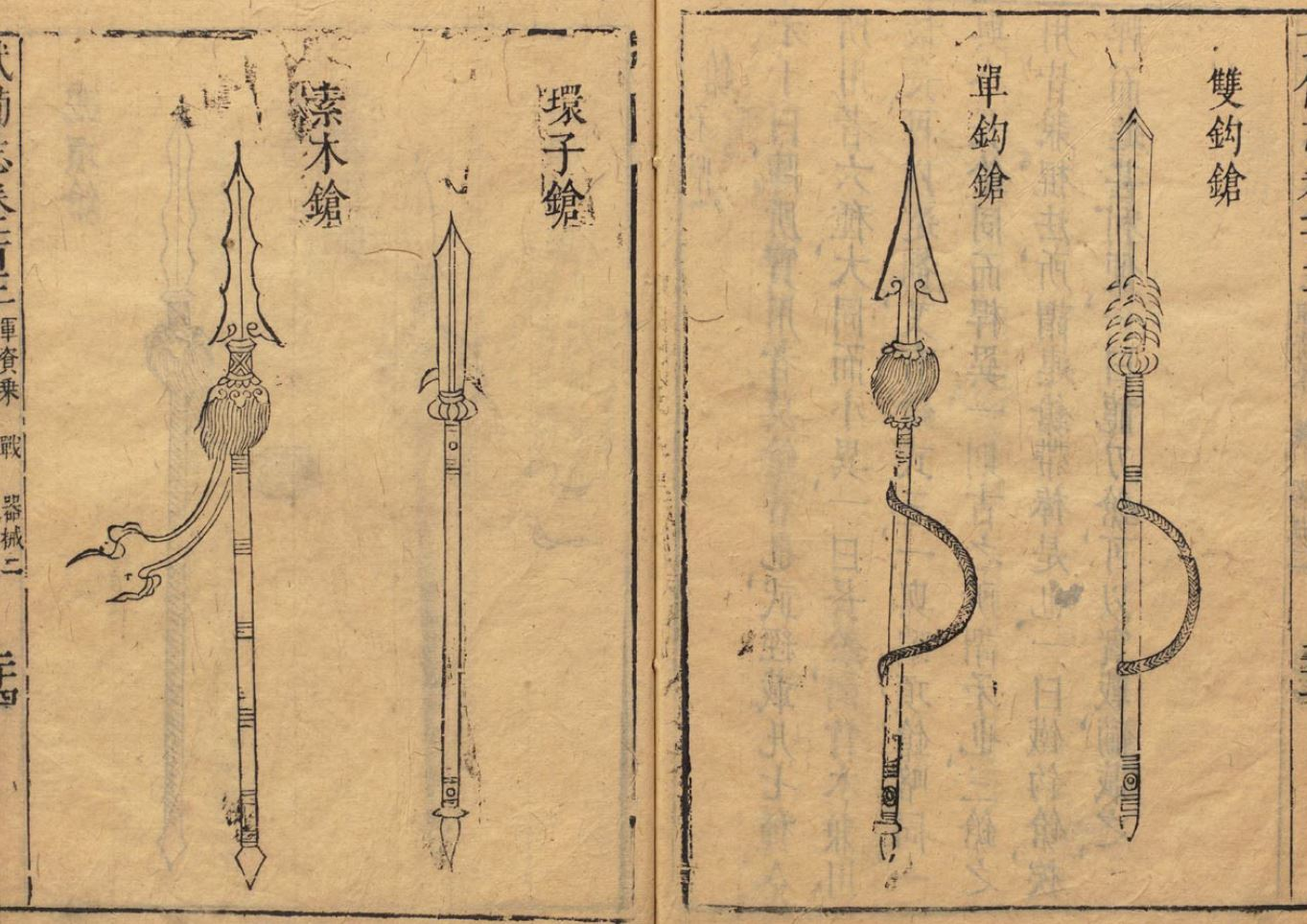

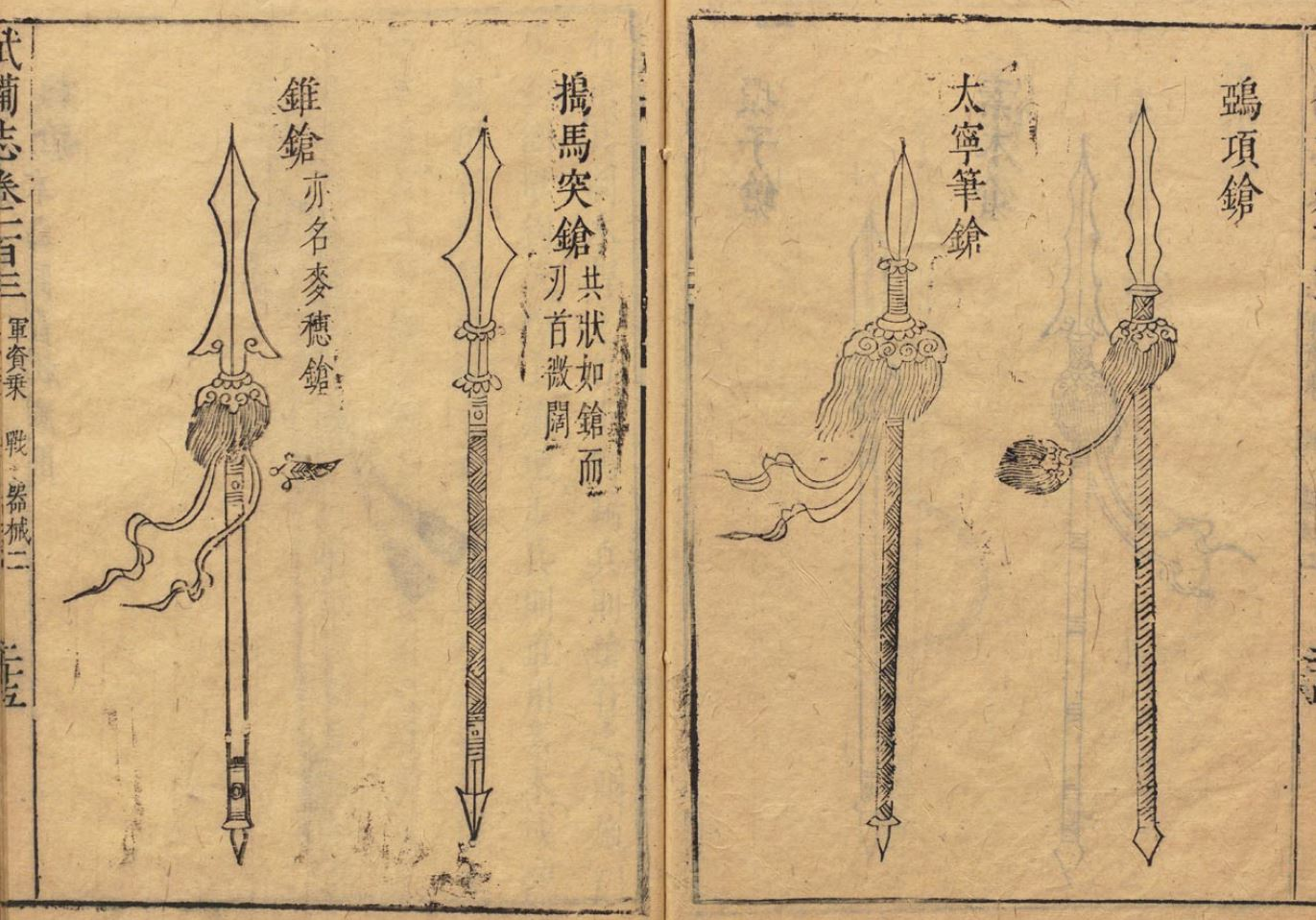

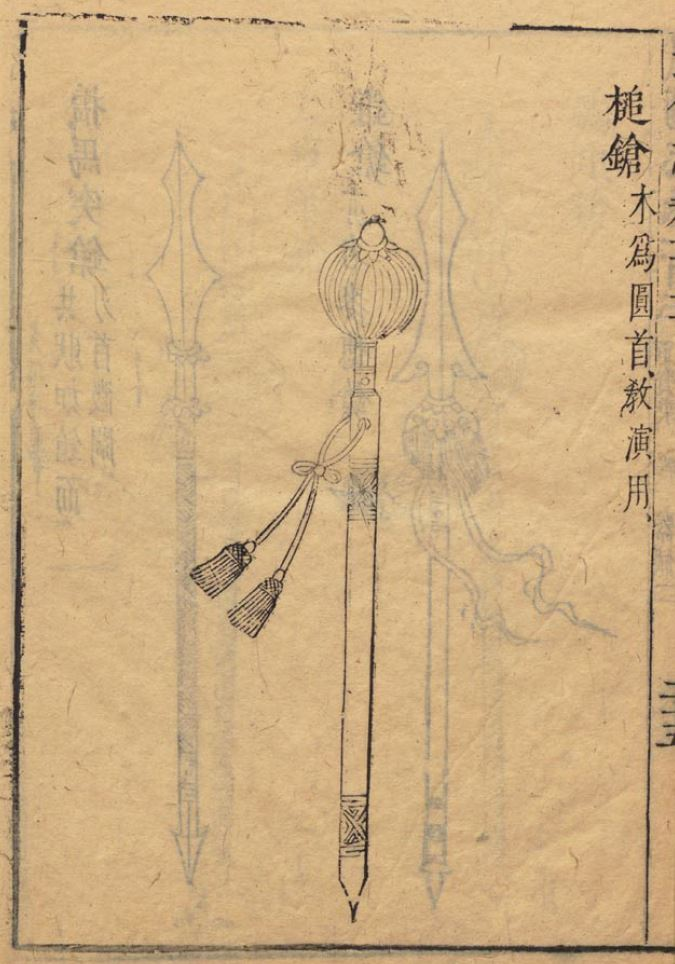

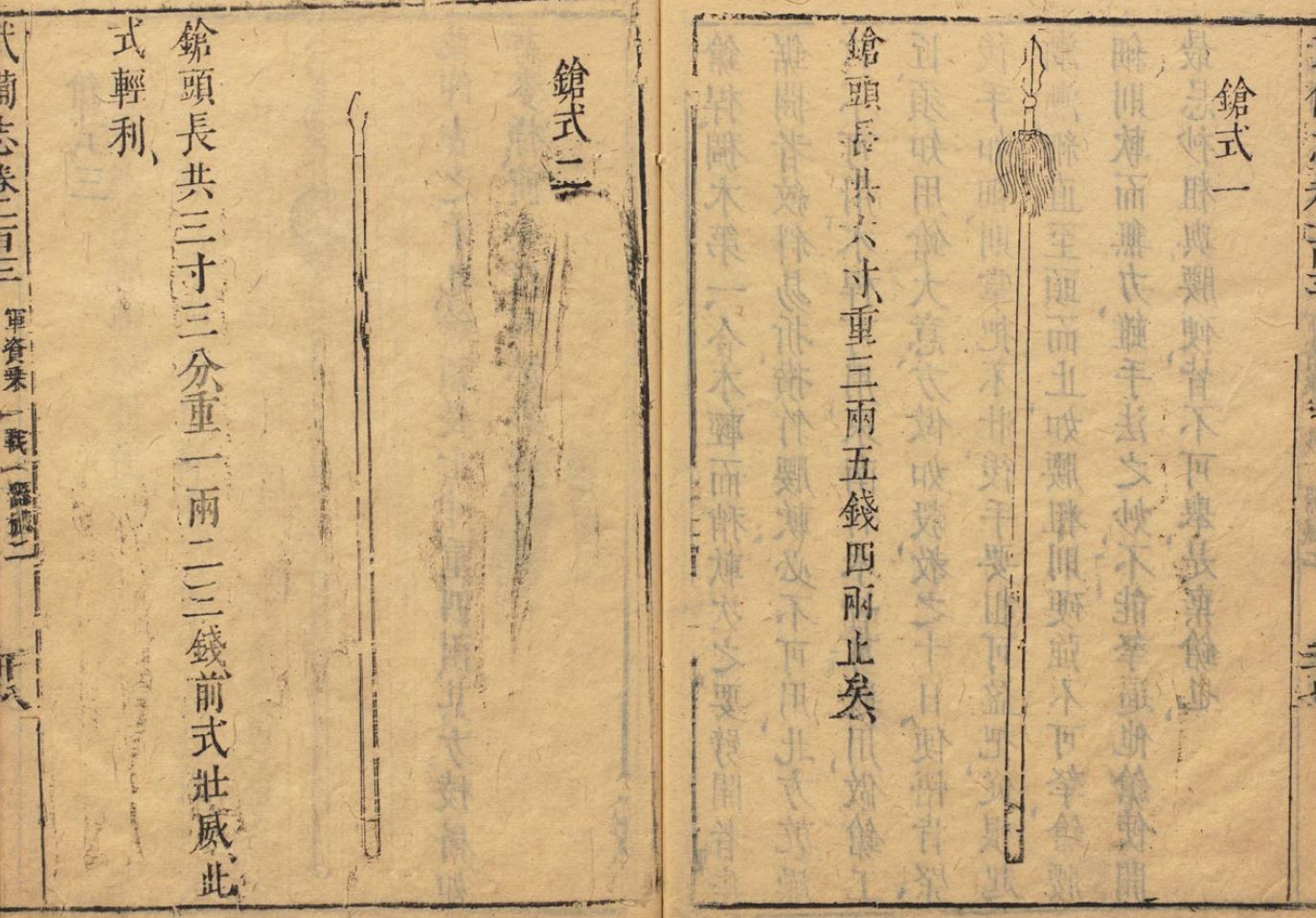

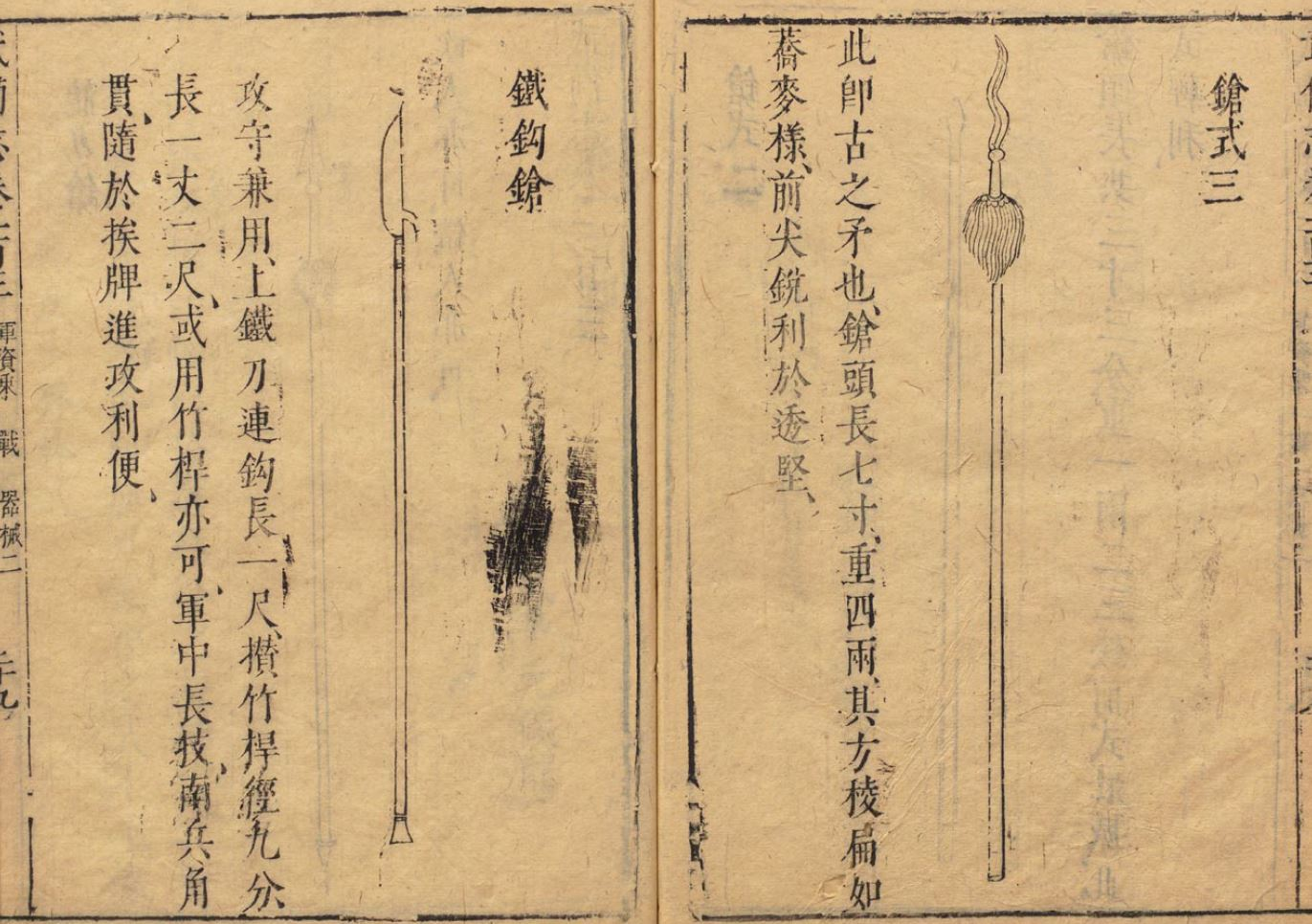

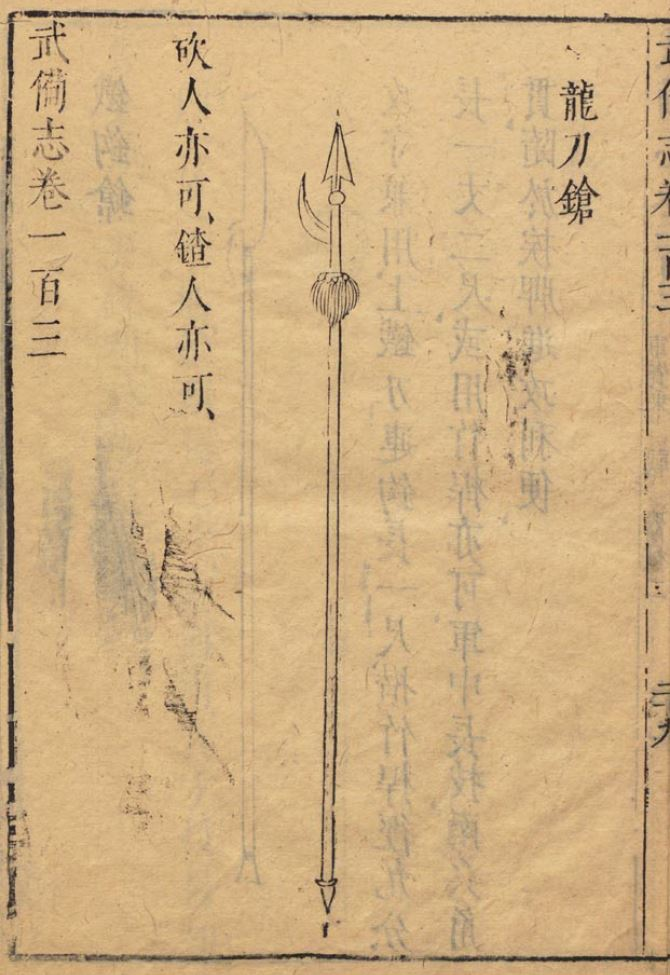

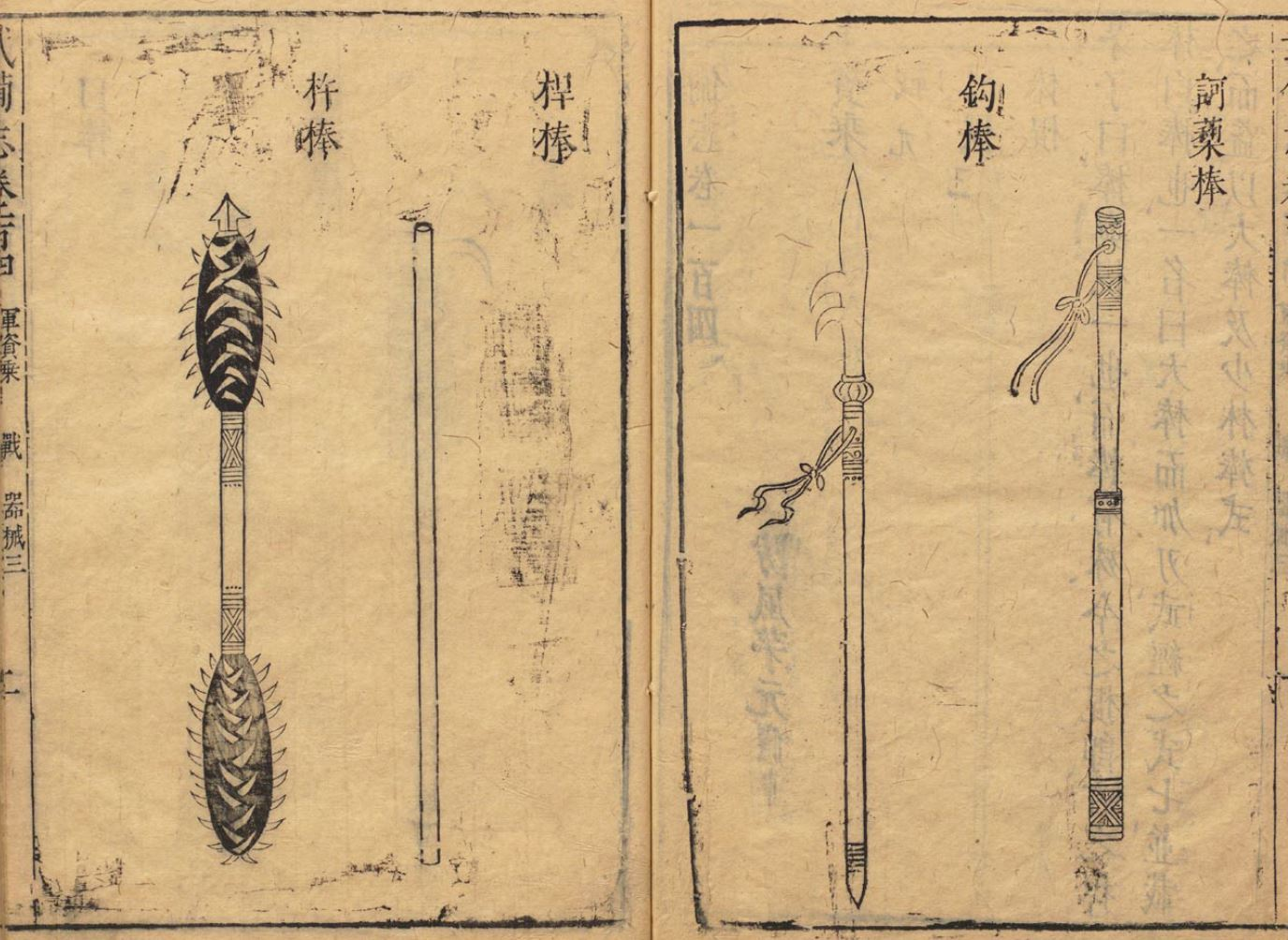

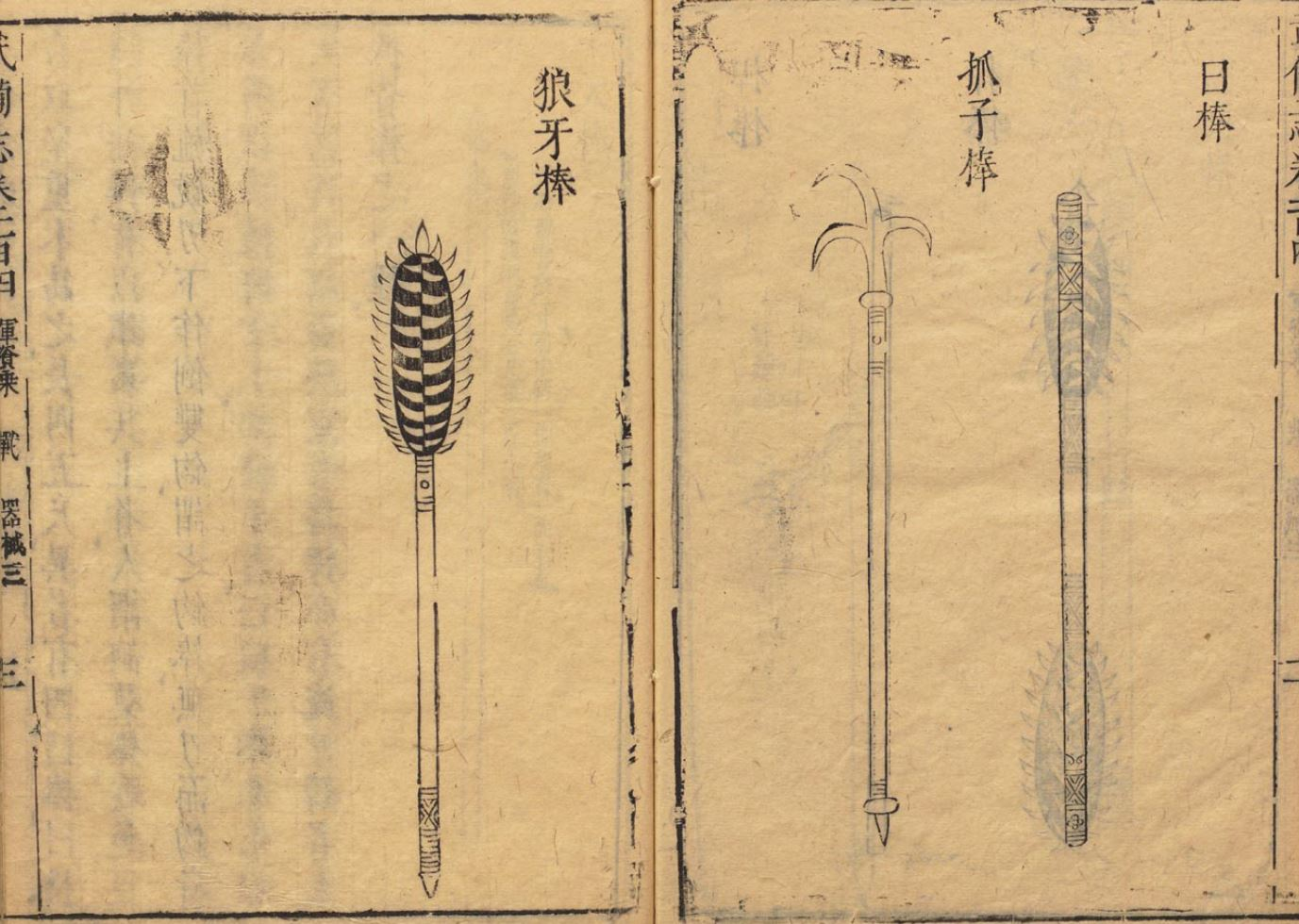

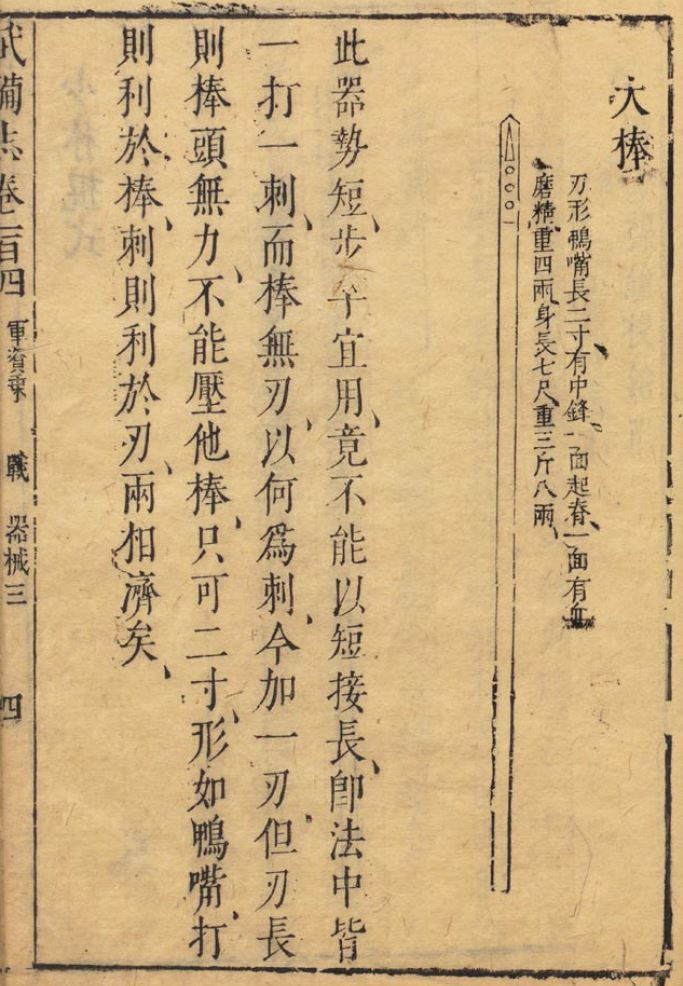

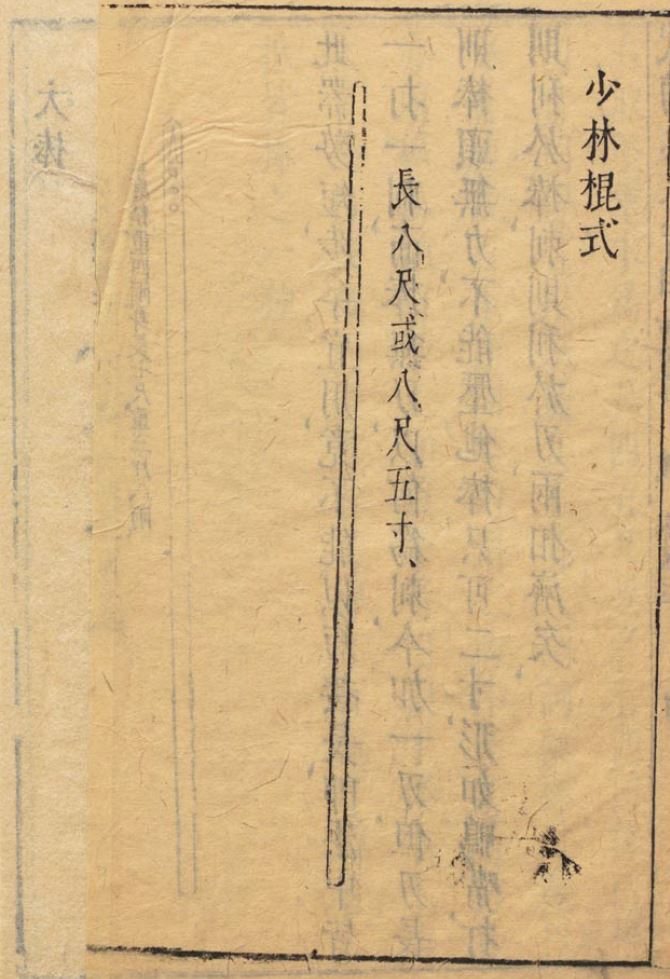

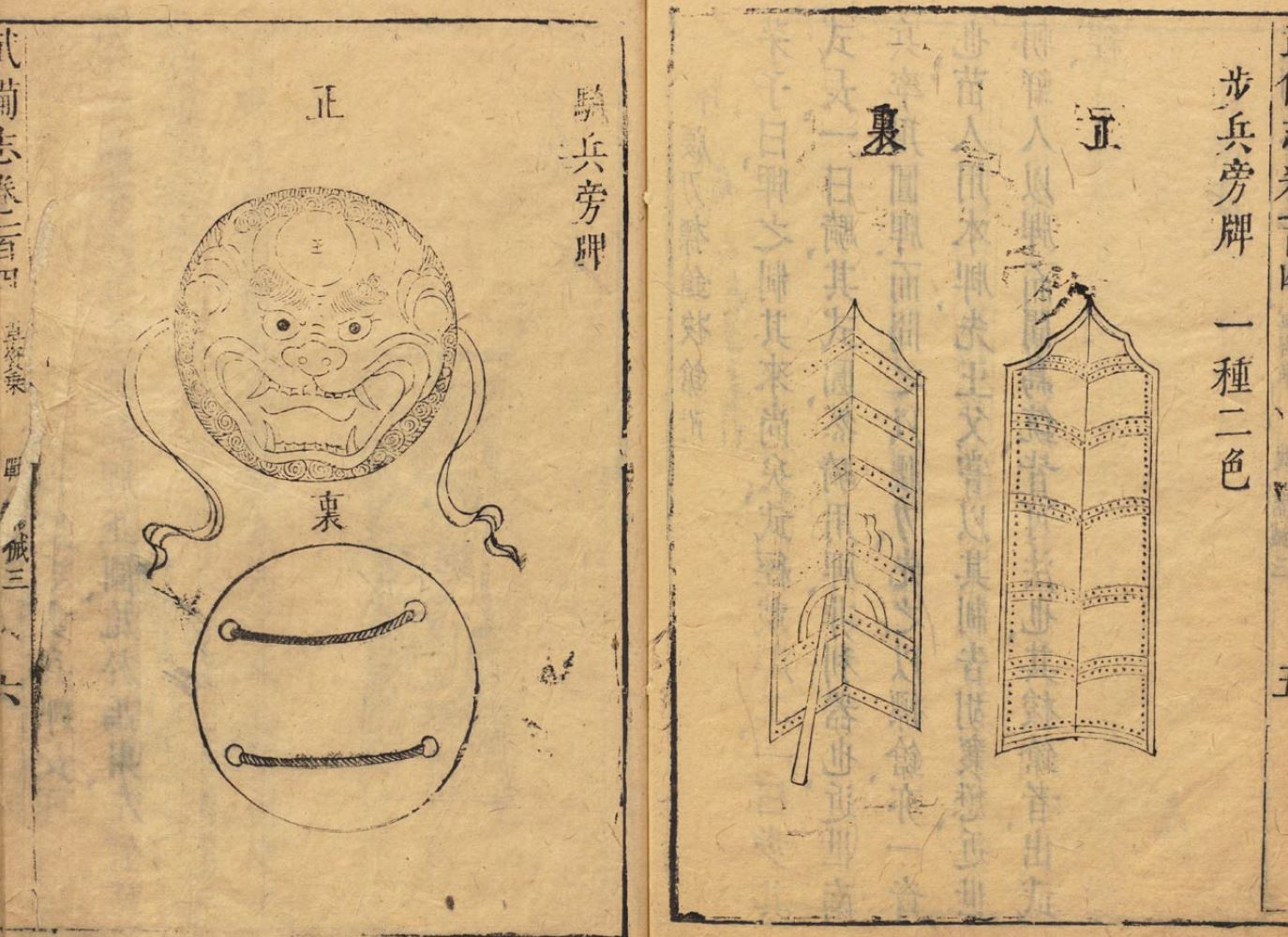

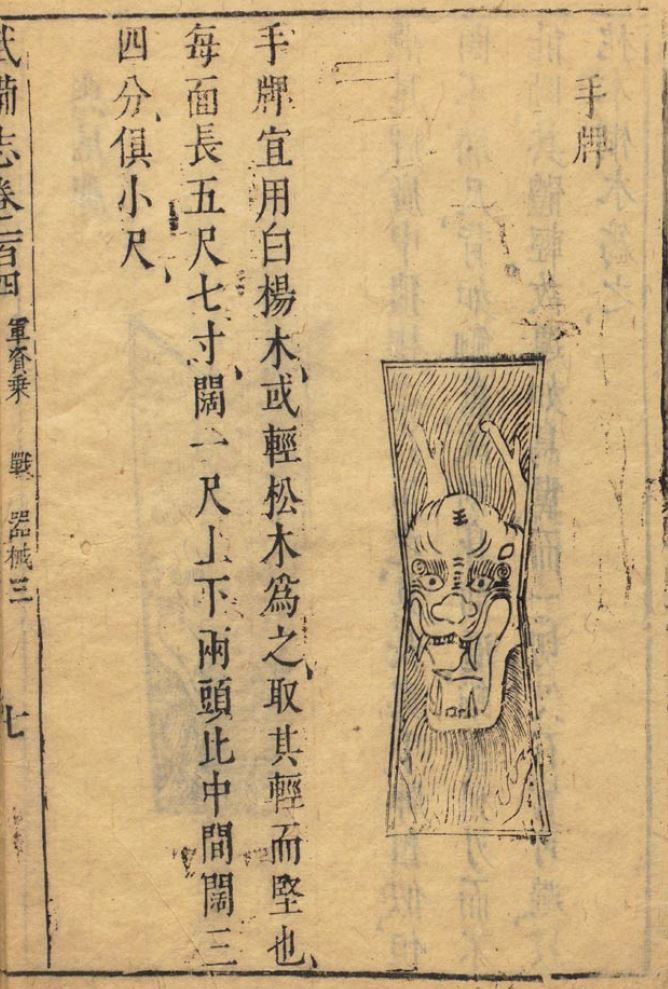

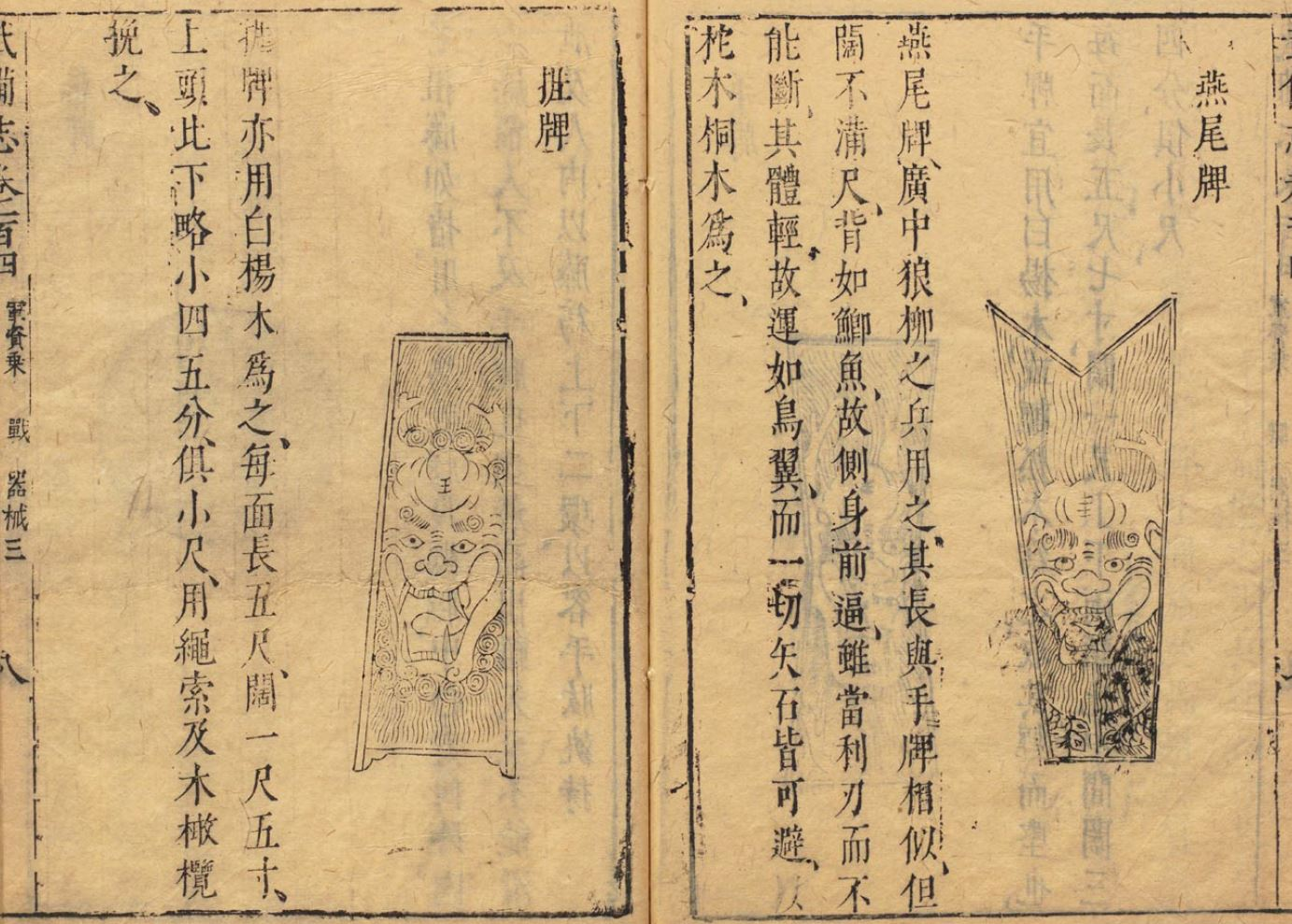

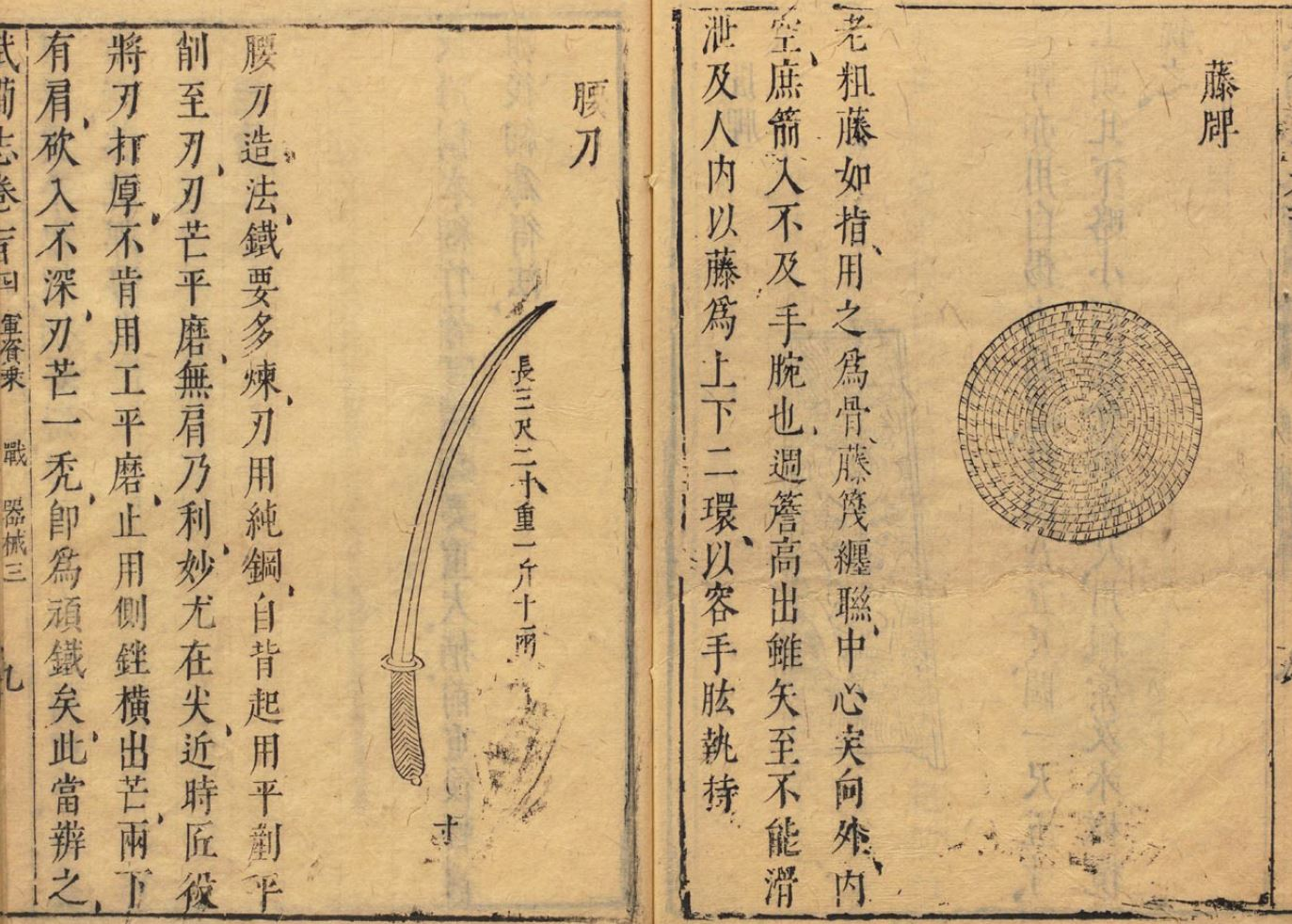

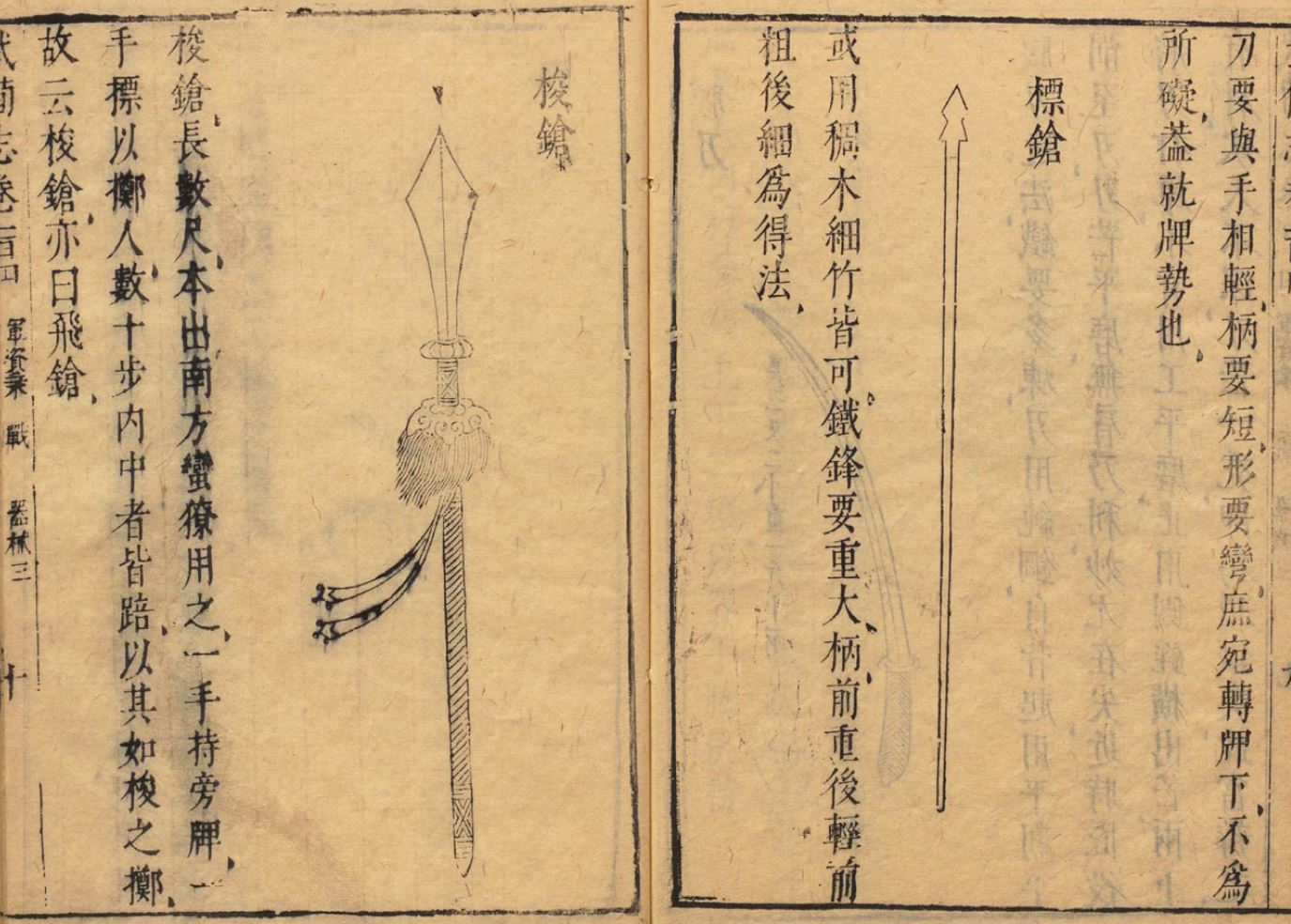

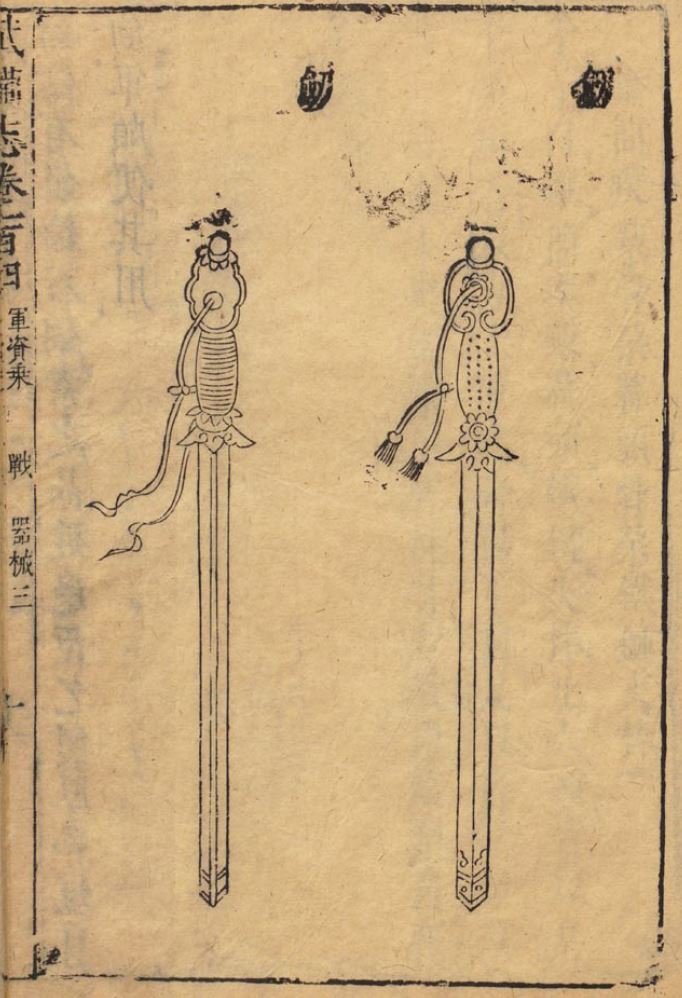

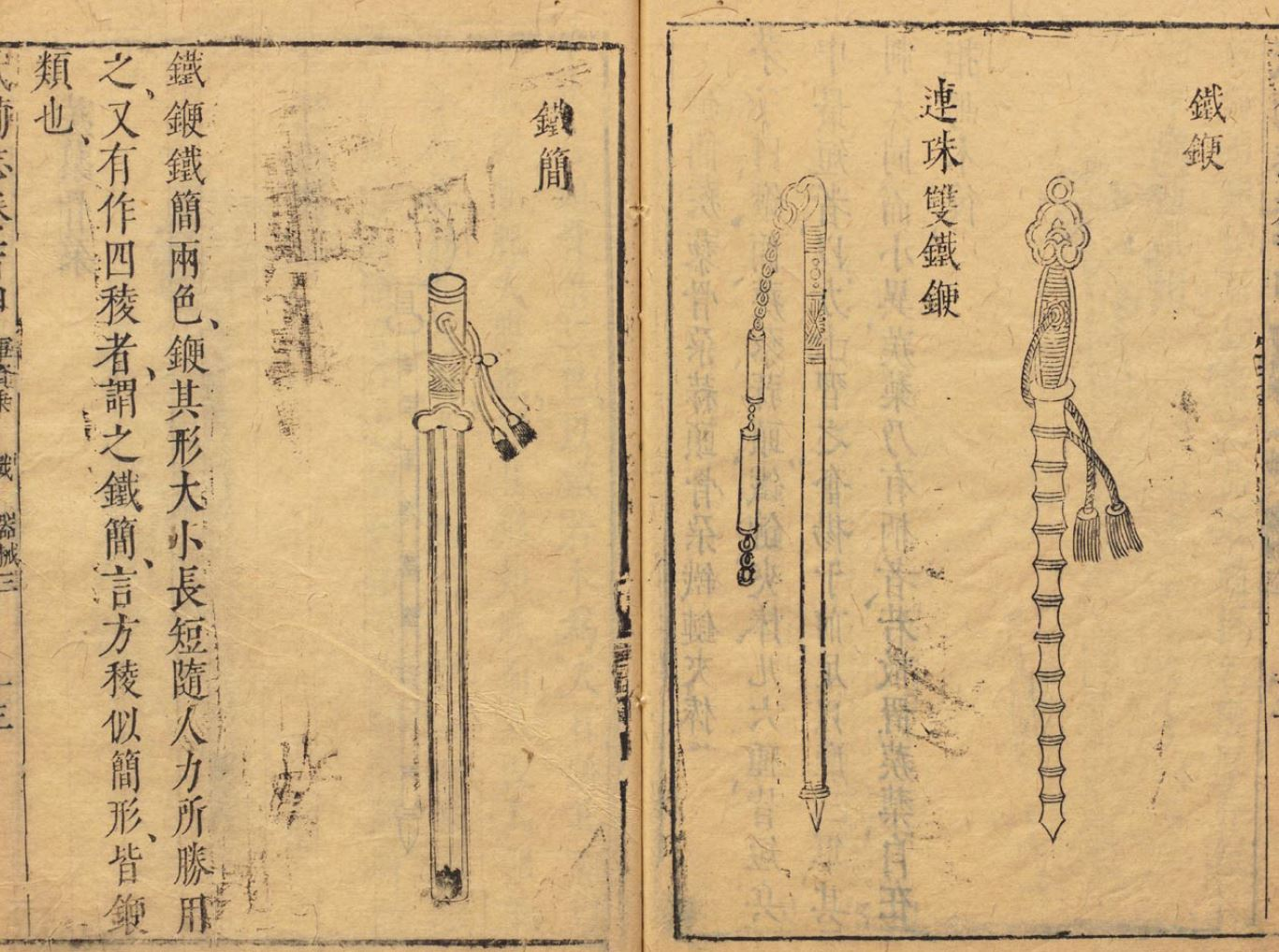

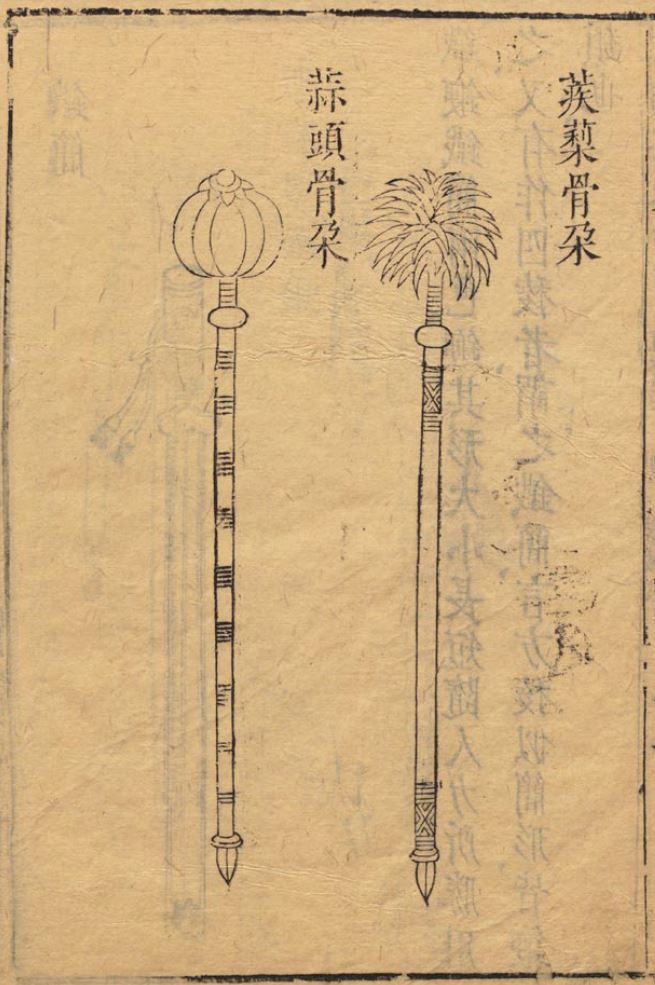

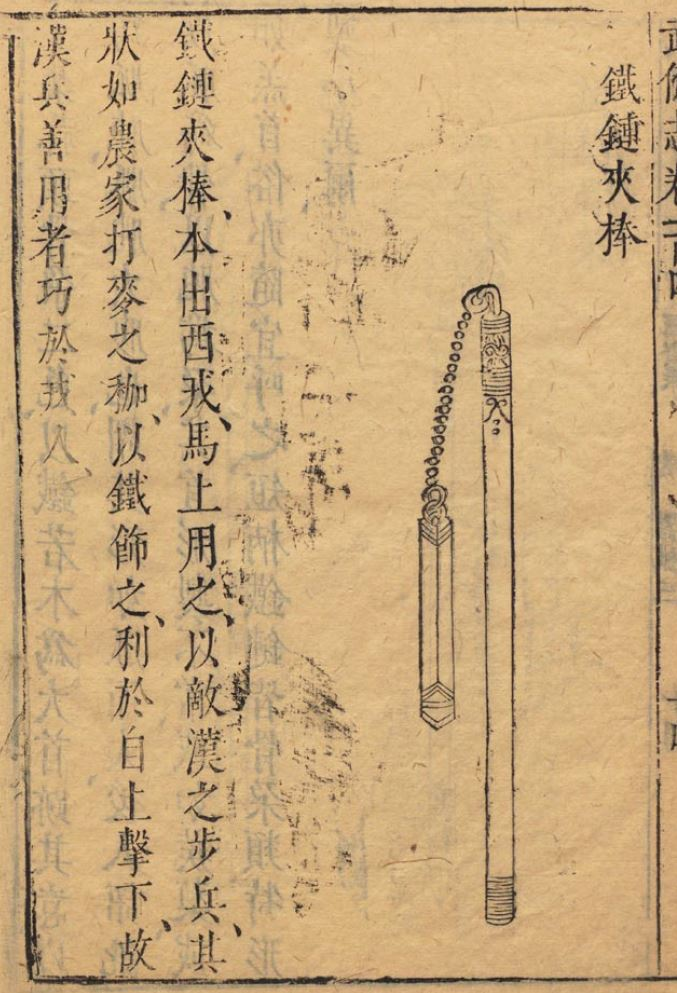

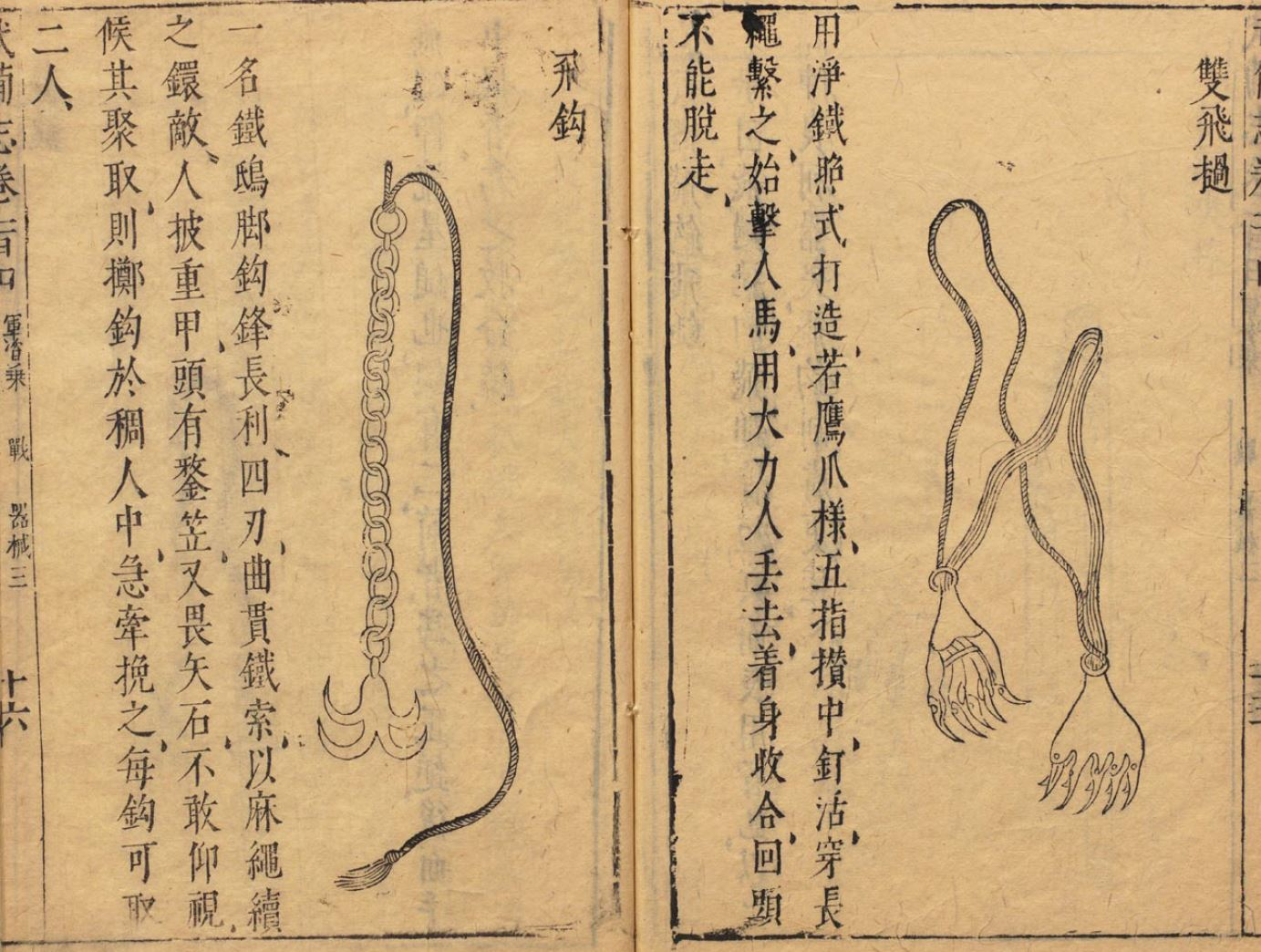

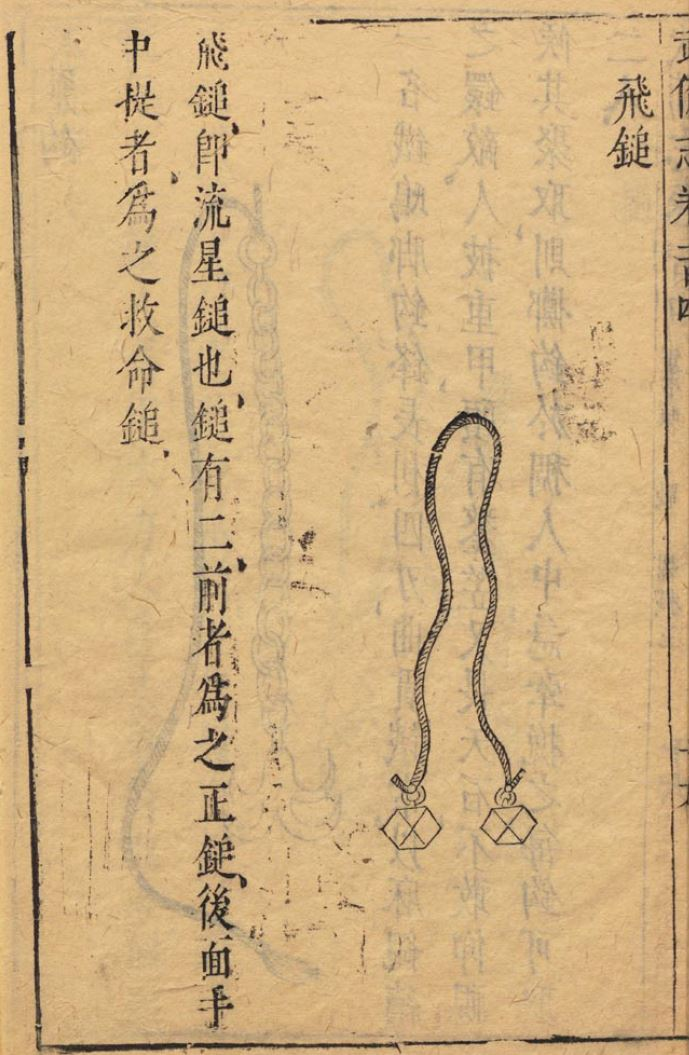

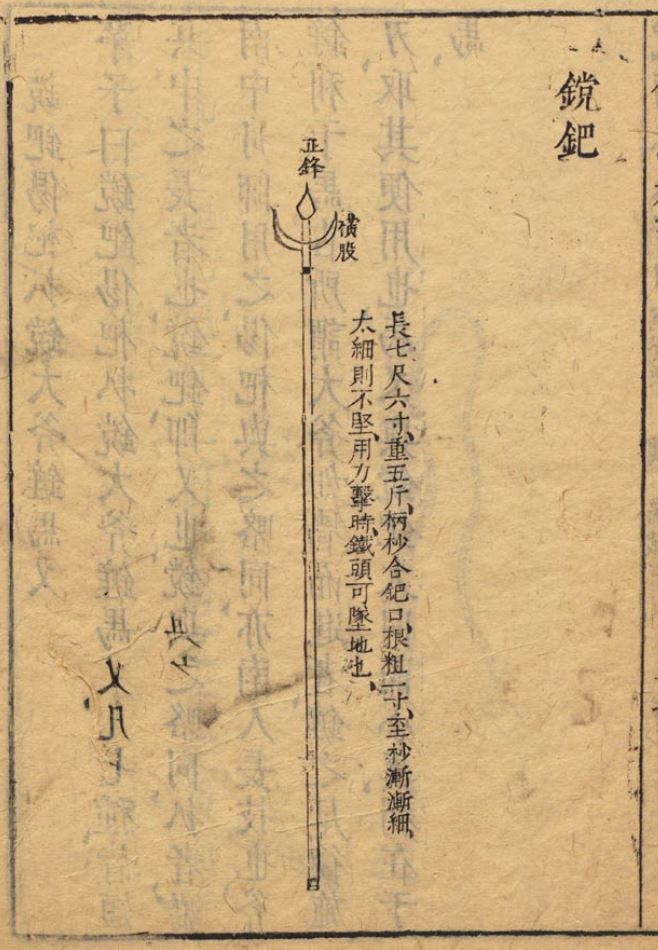

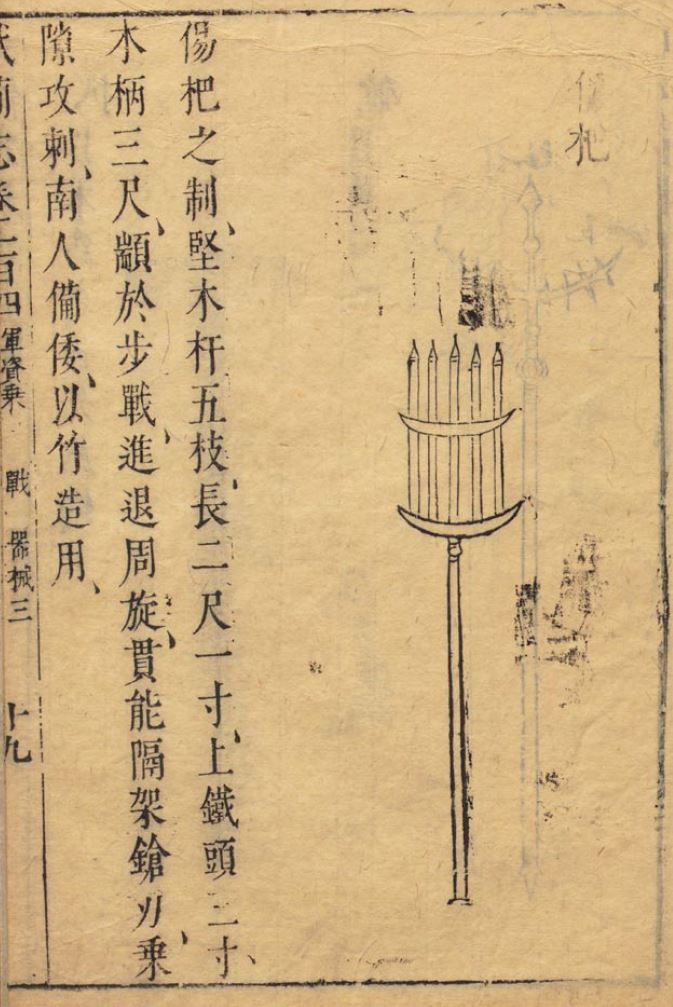

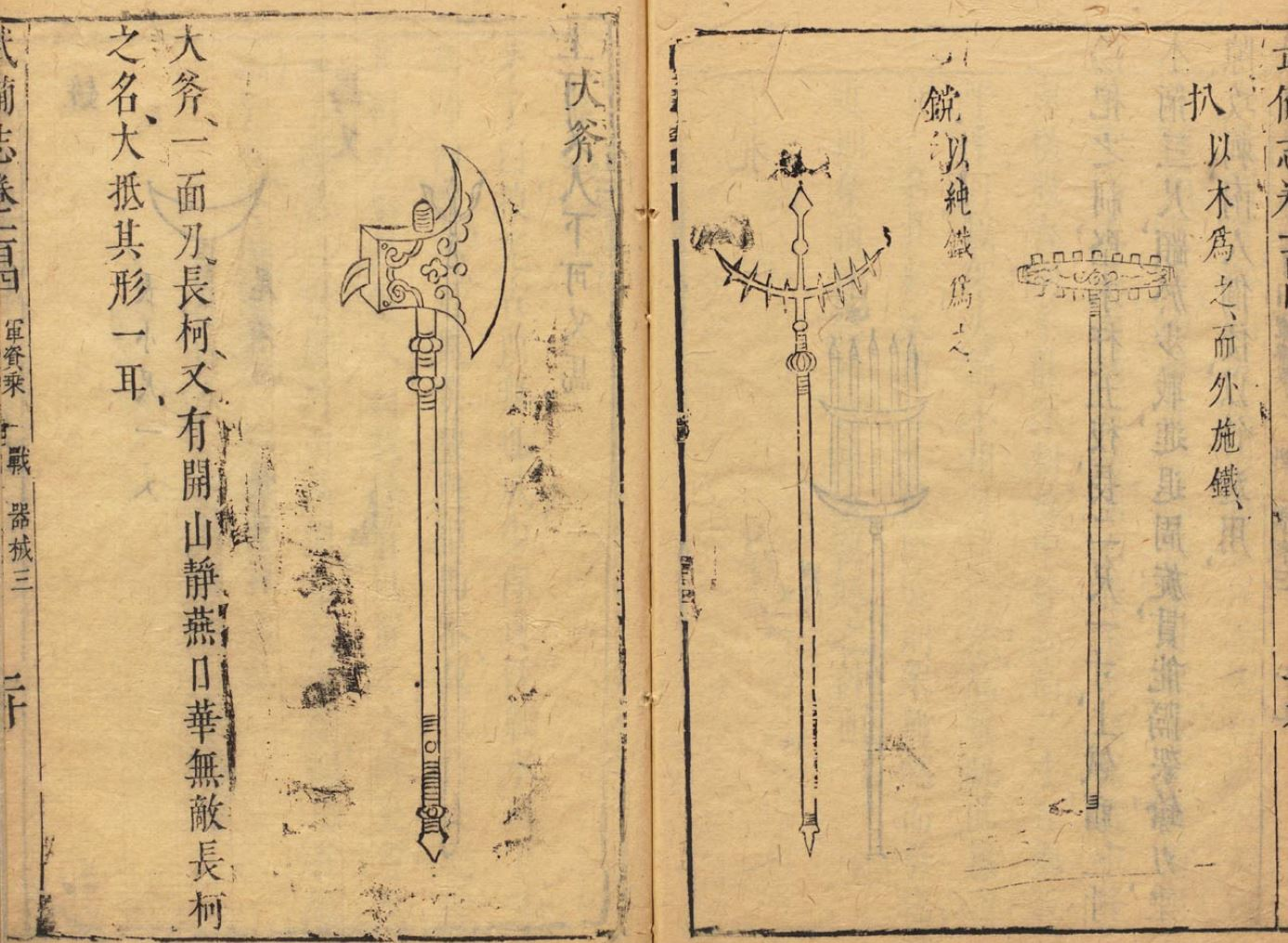

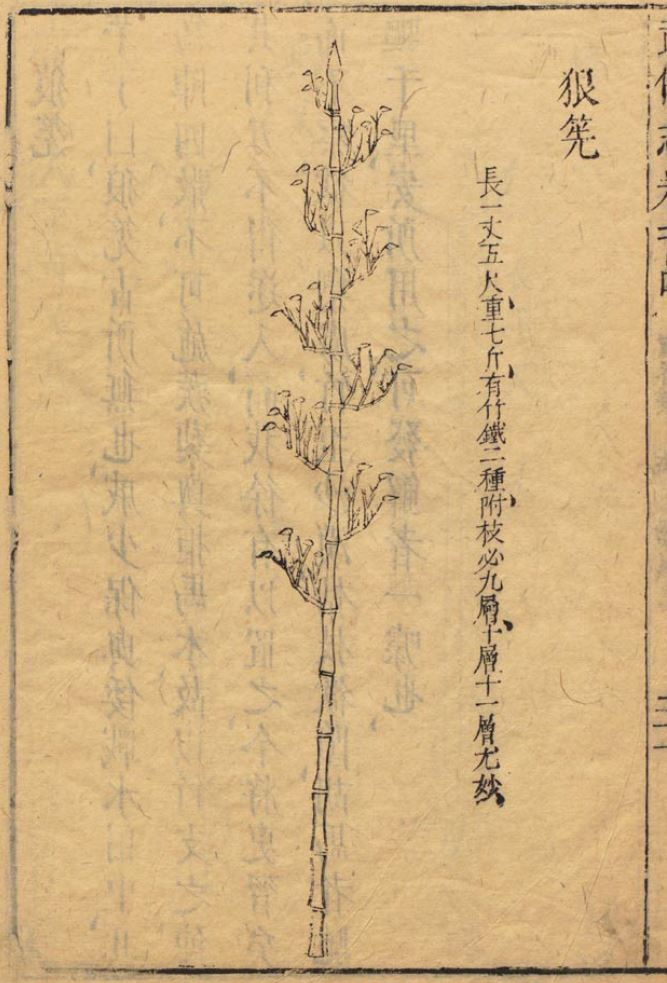

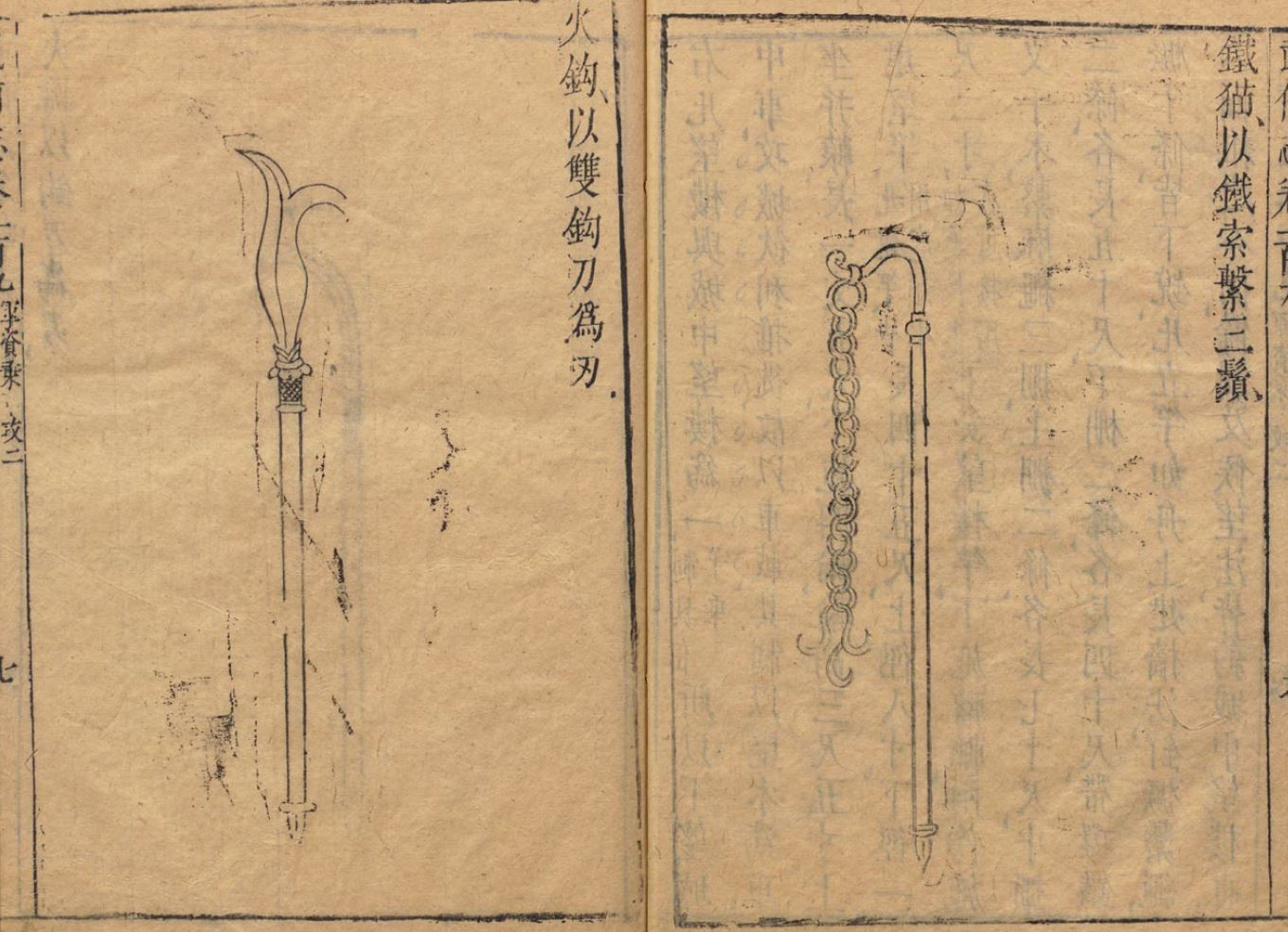

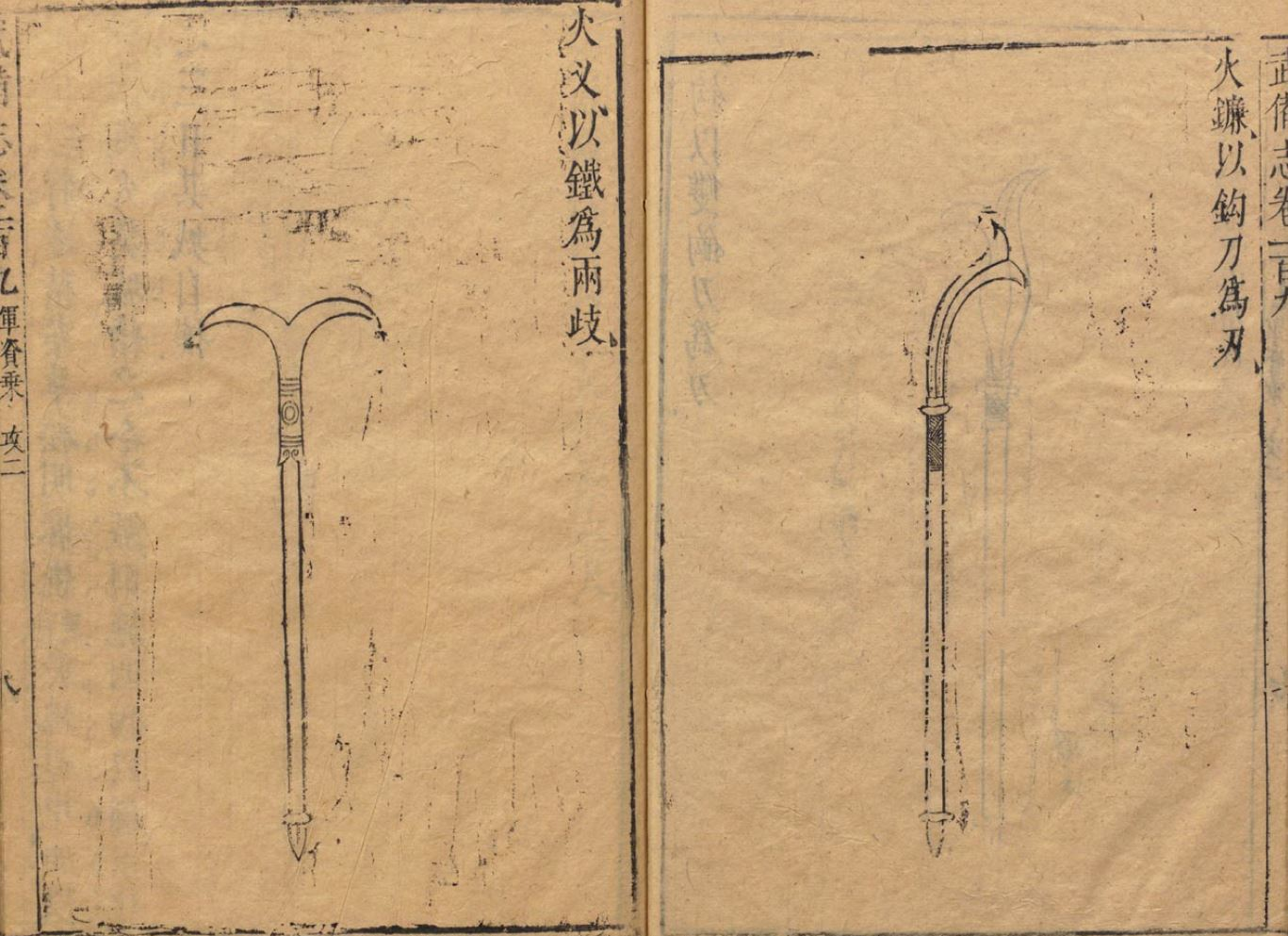

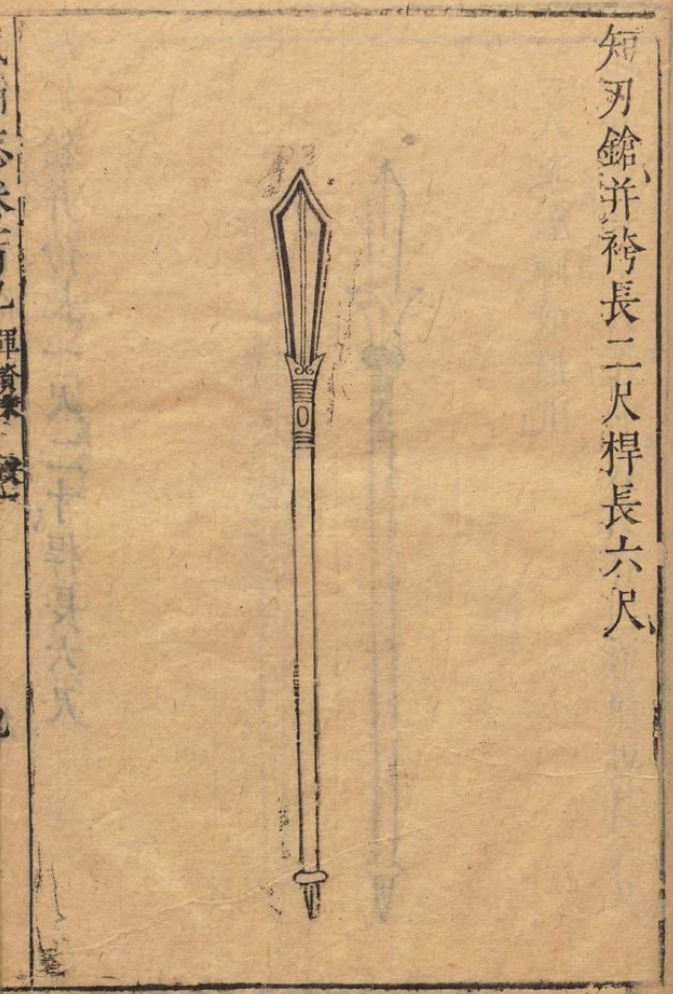

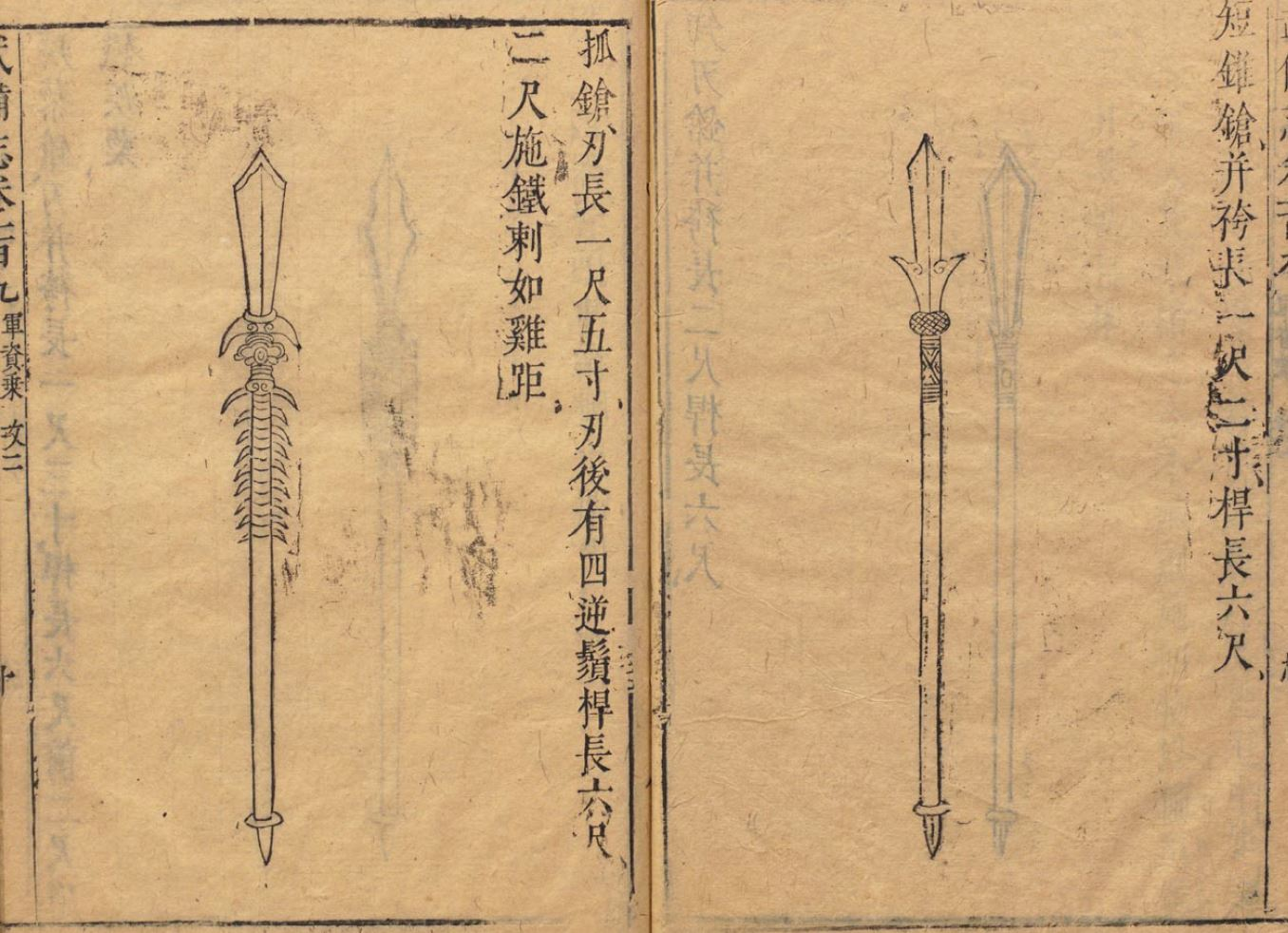

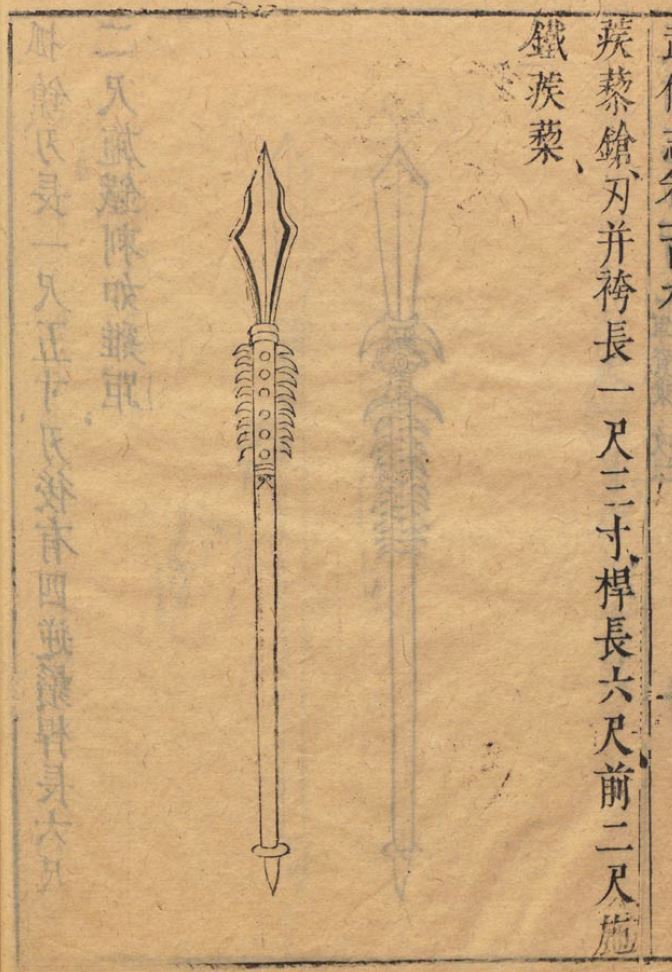

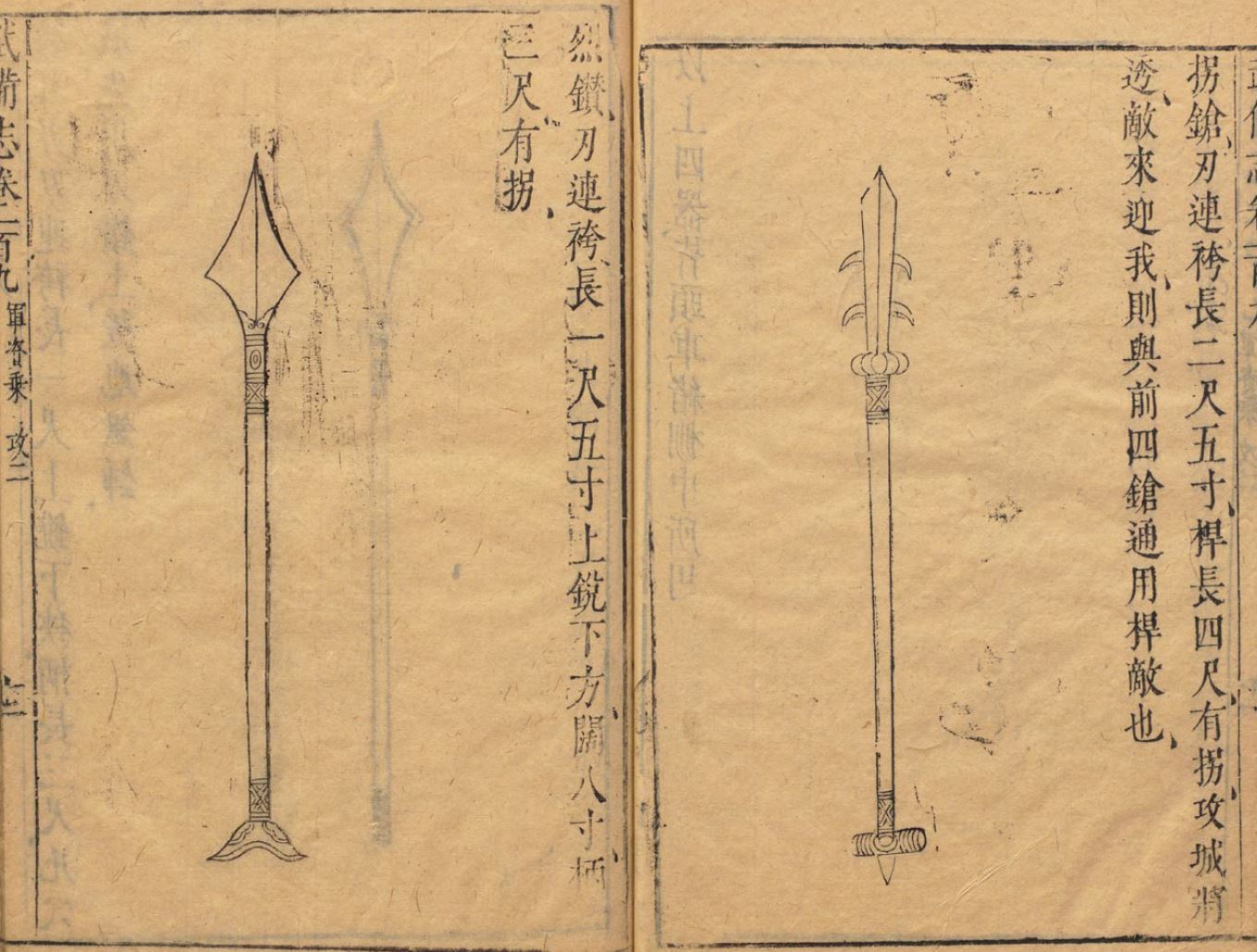

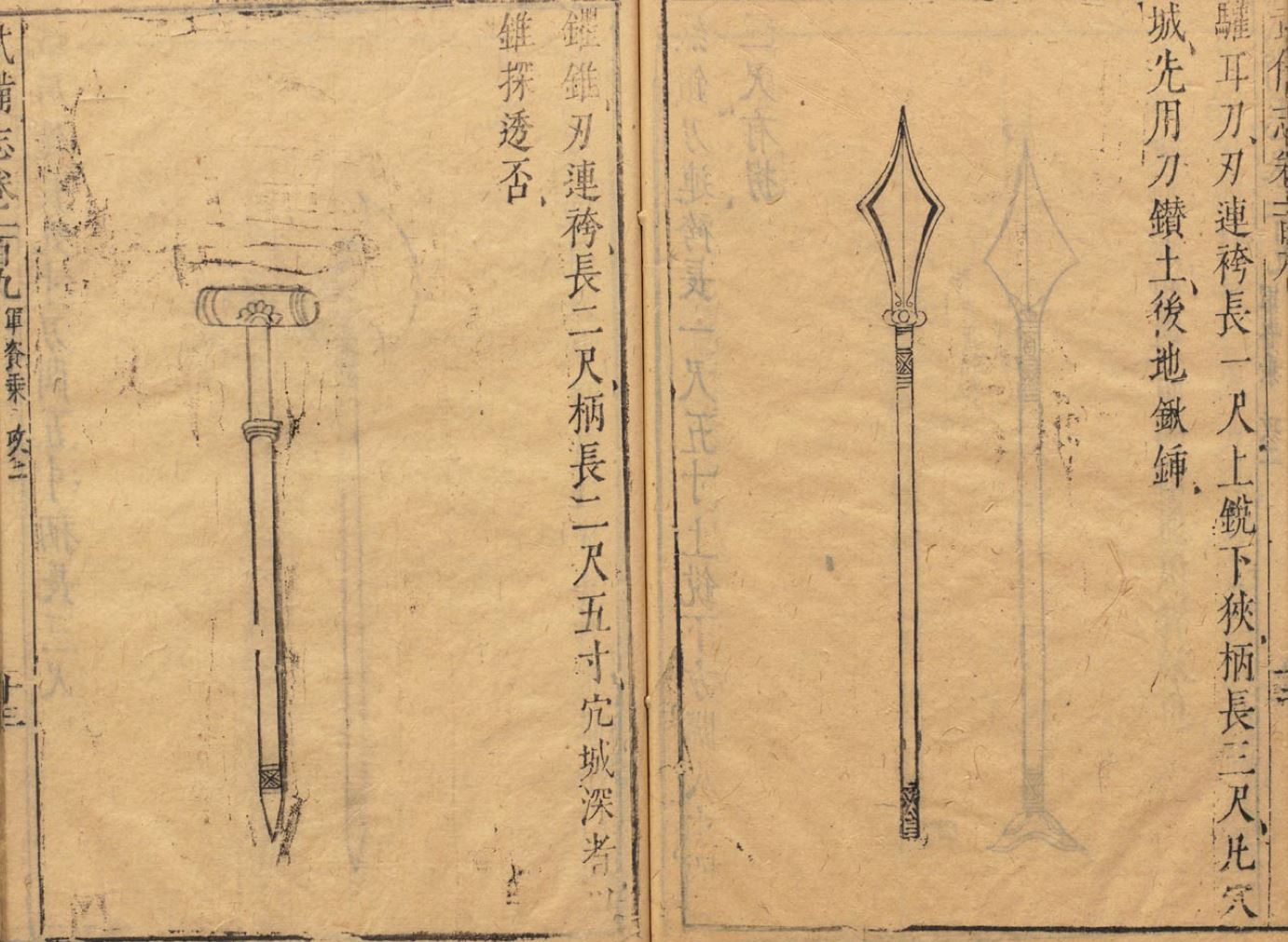

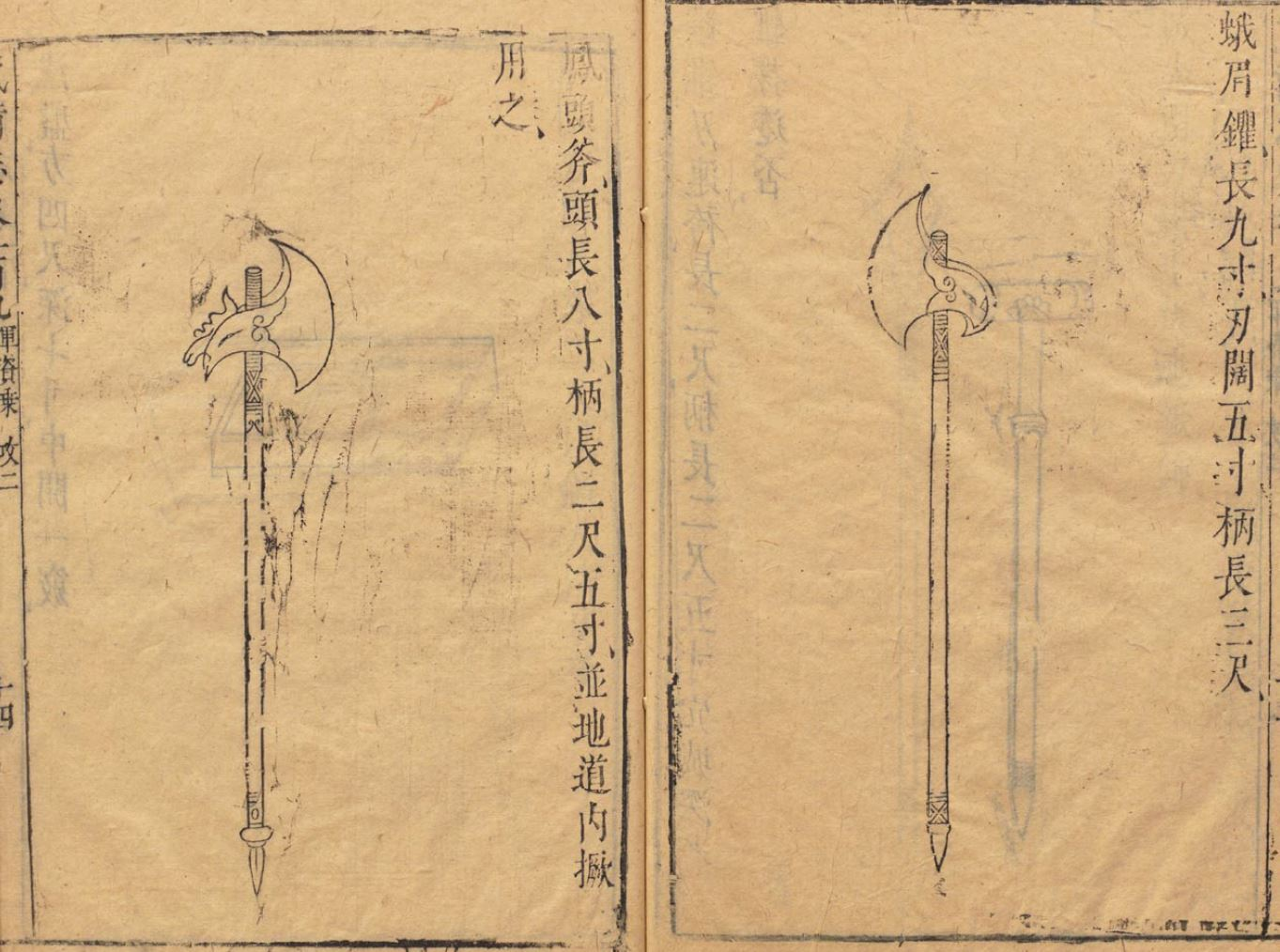

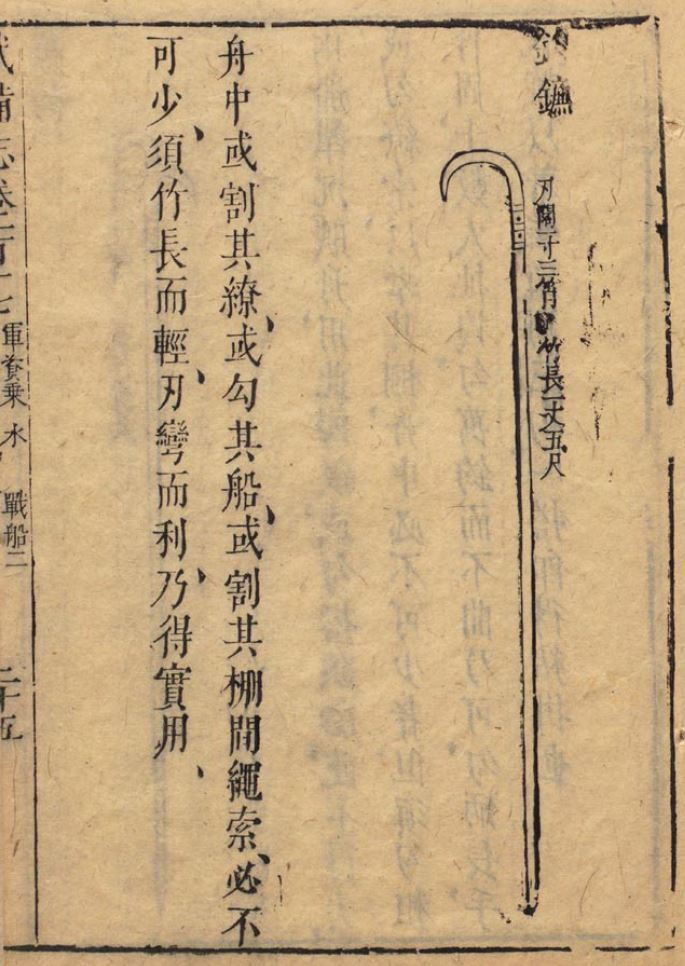

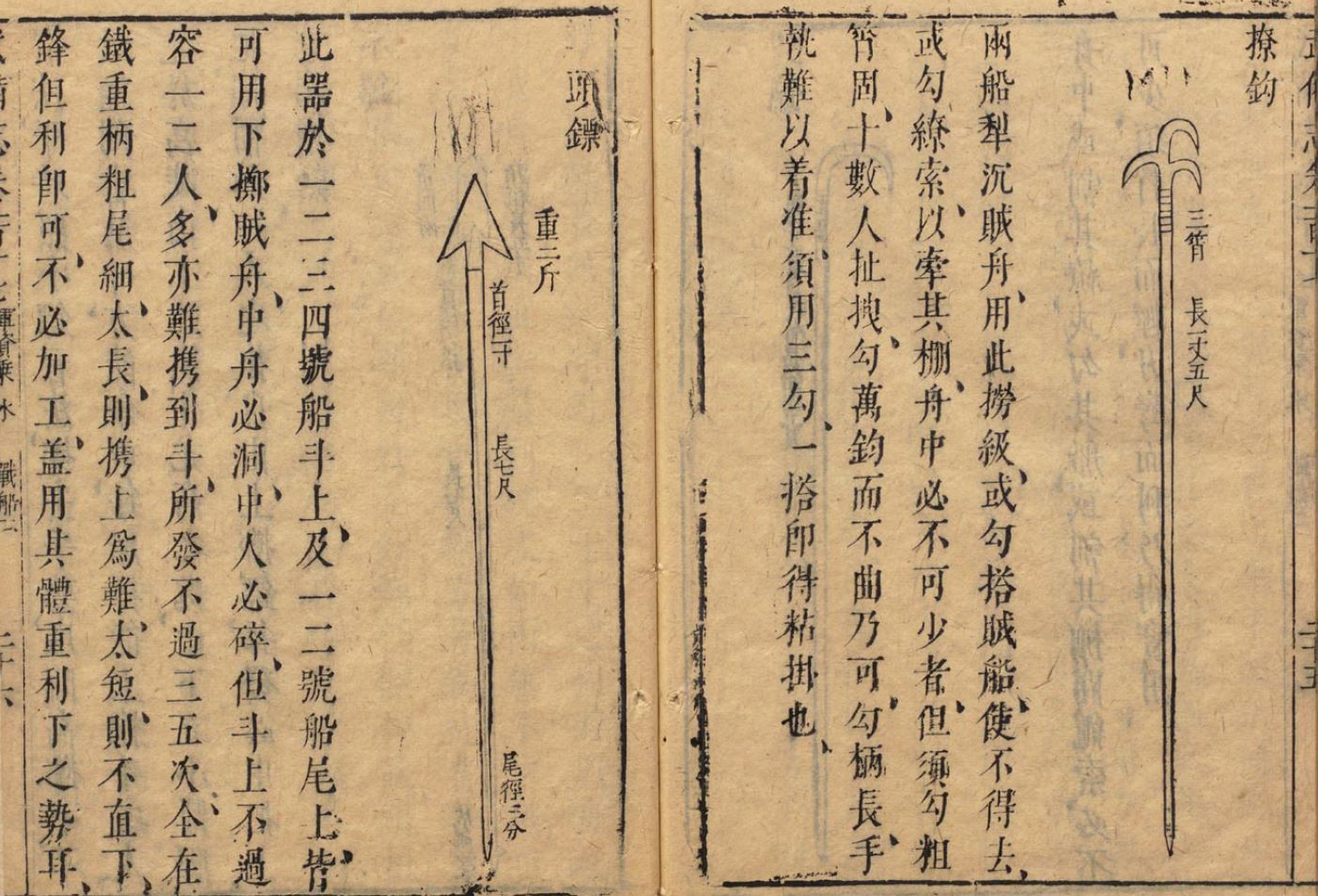

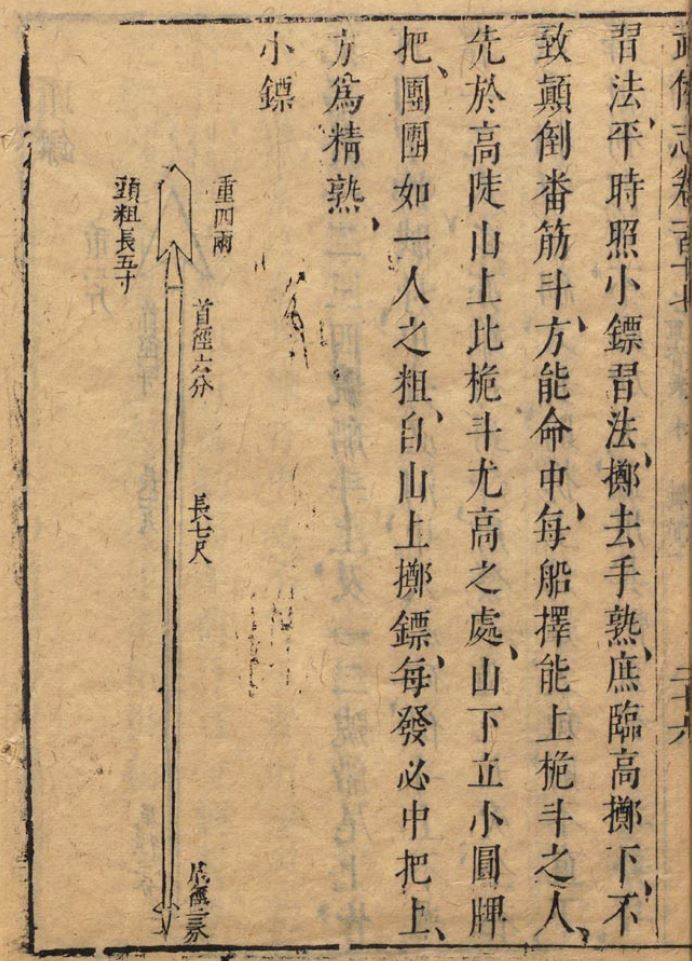

=== Bows and crossbows ===
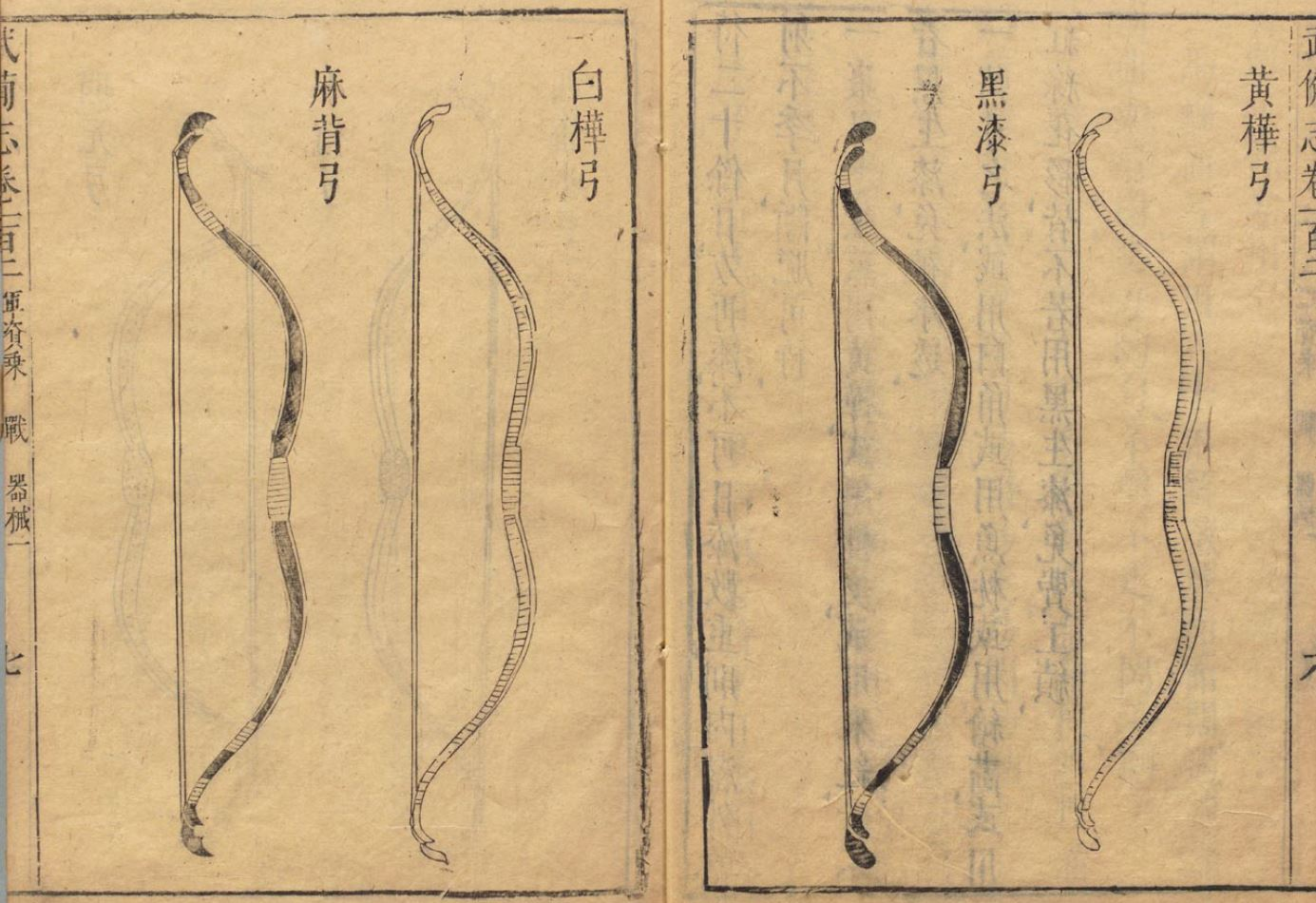

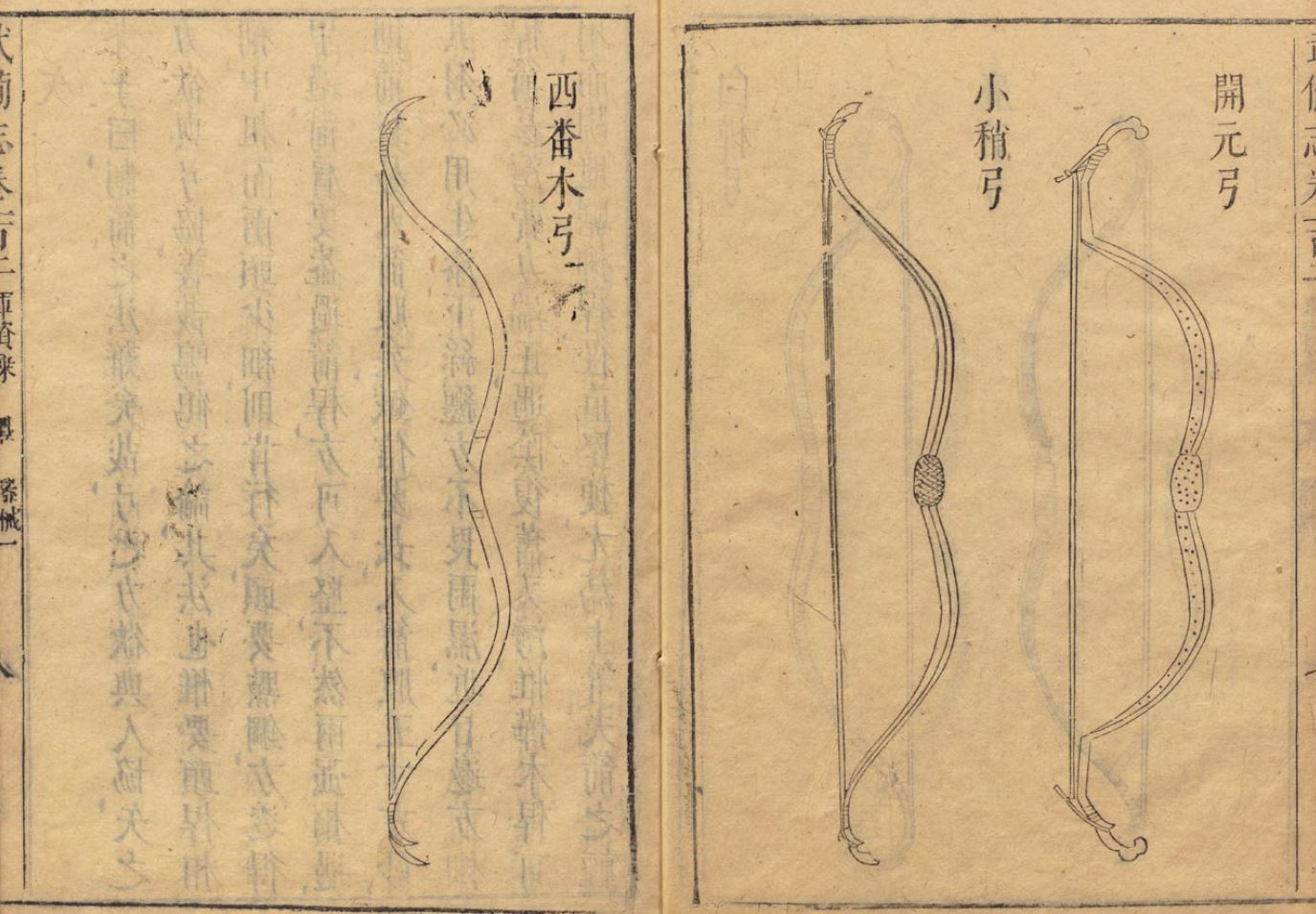

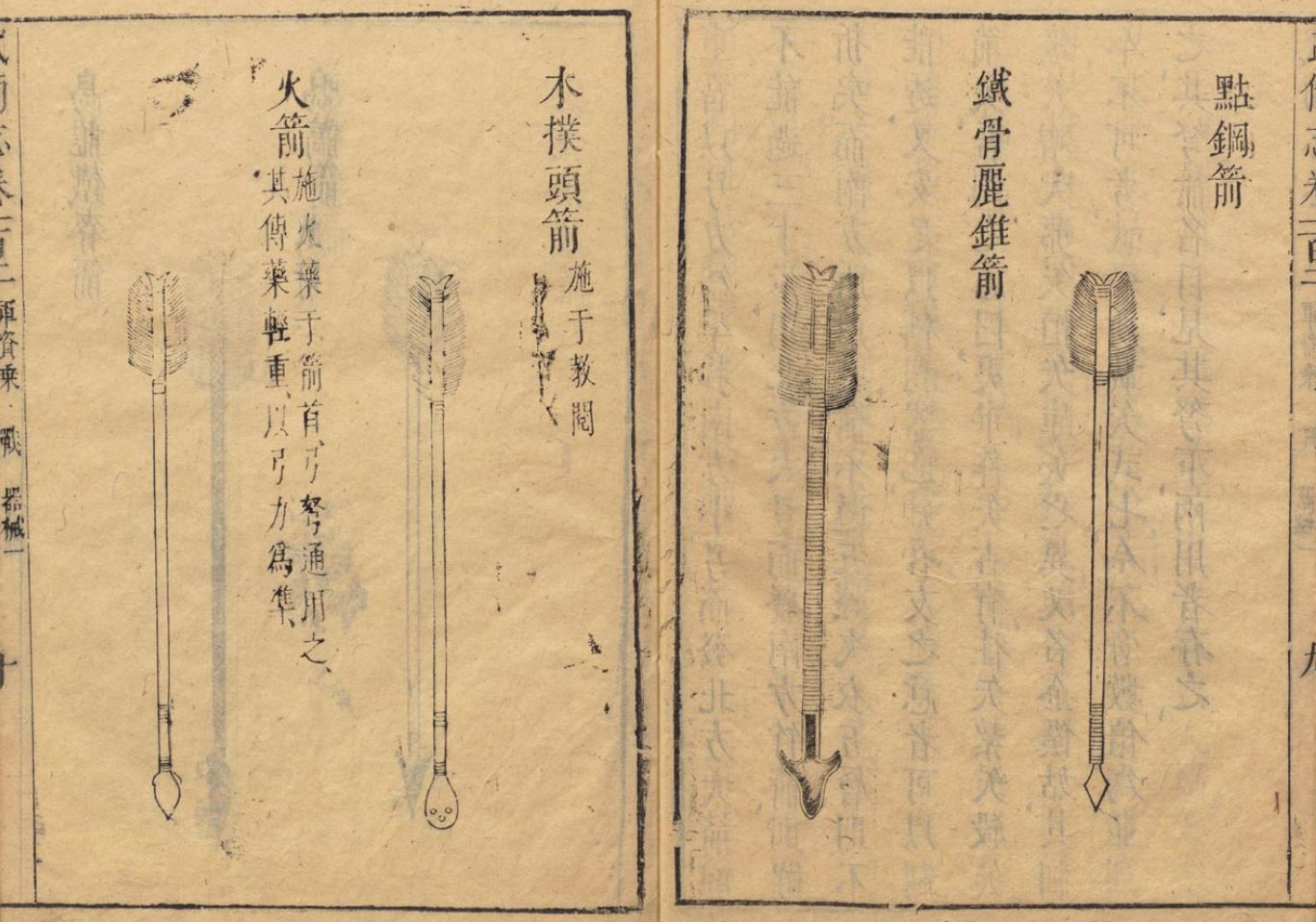

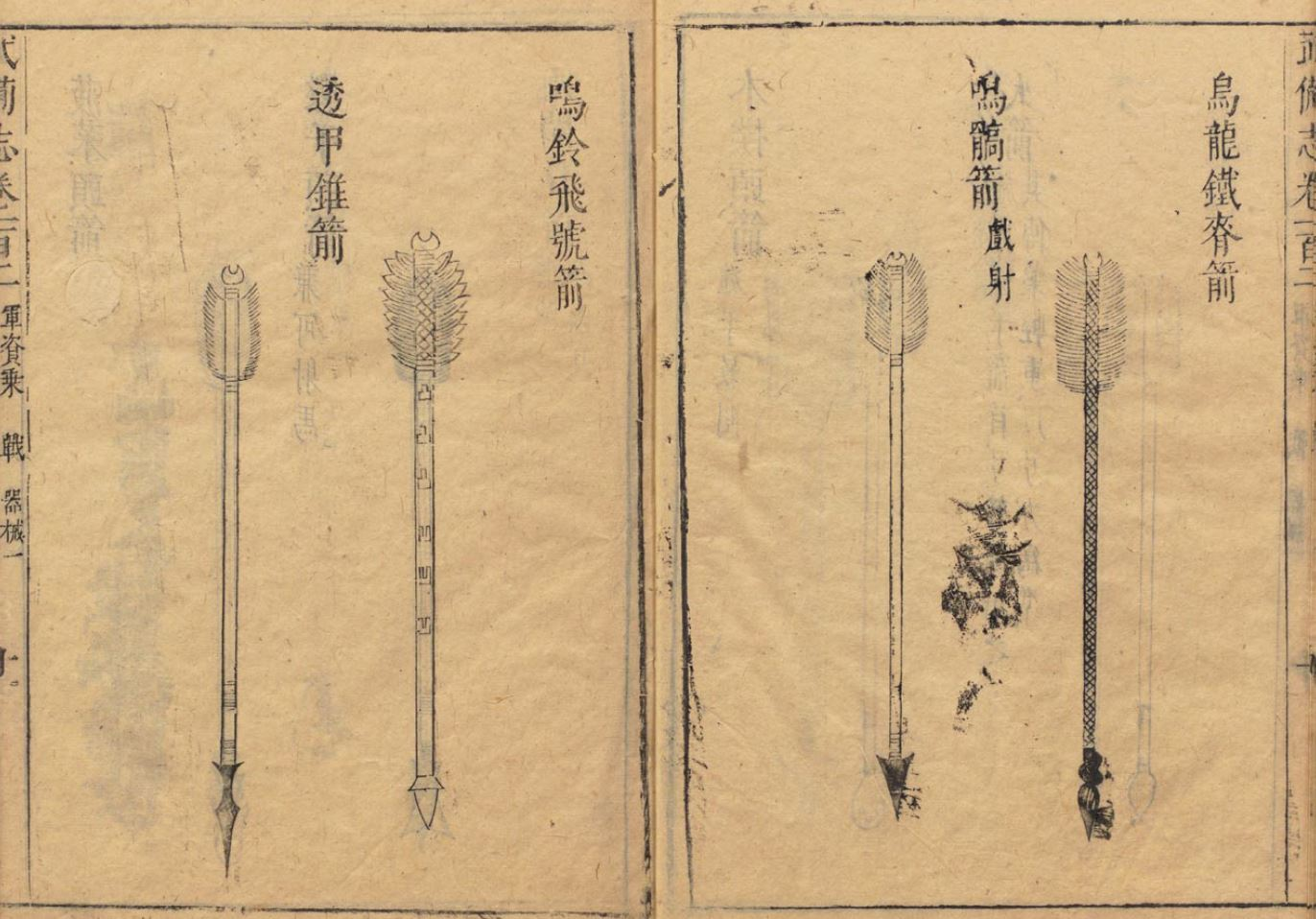

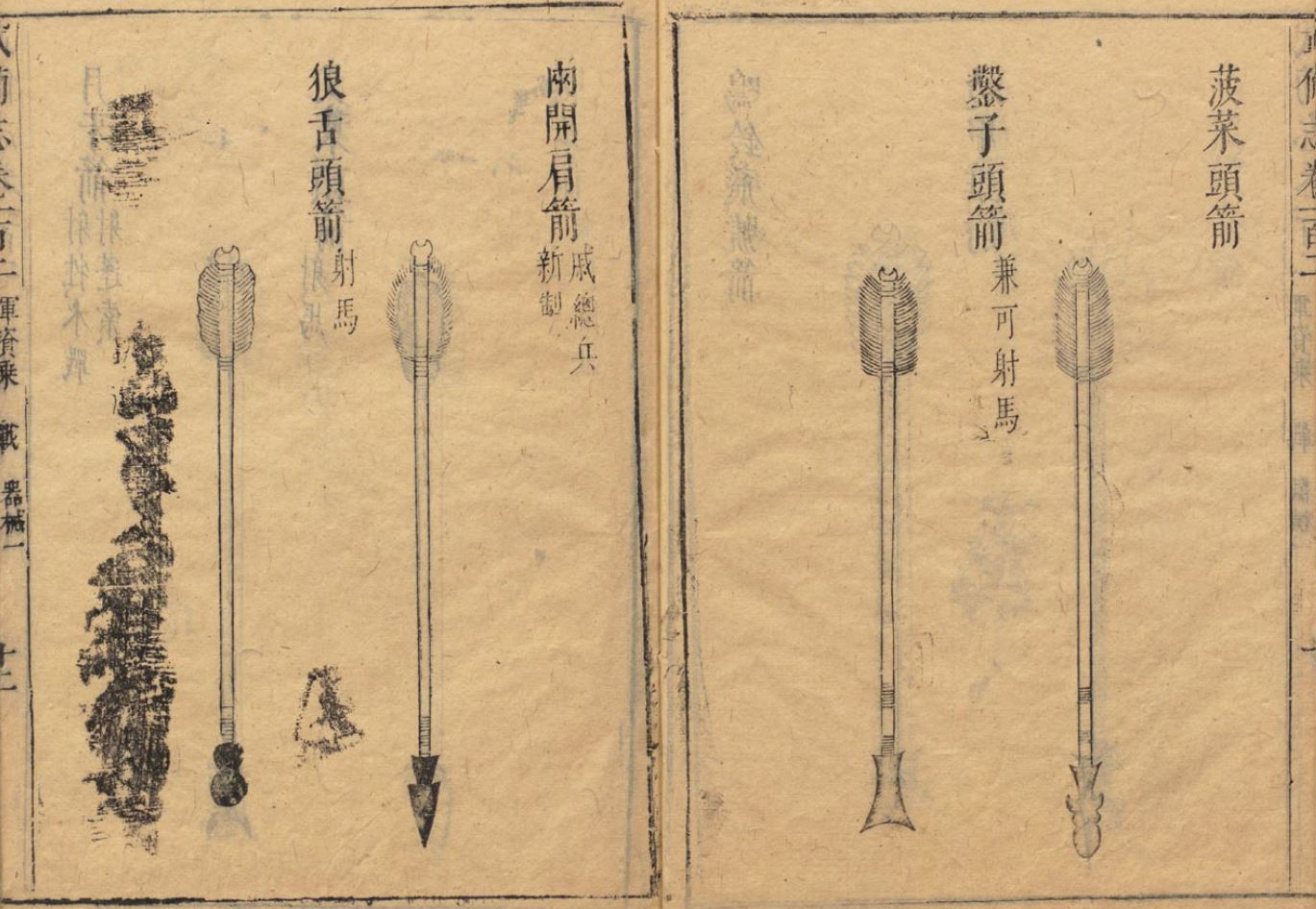

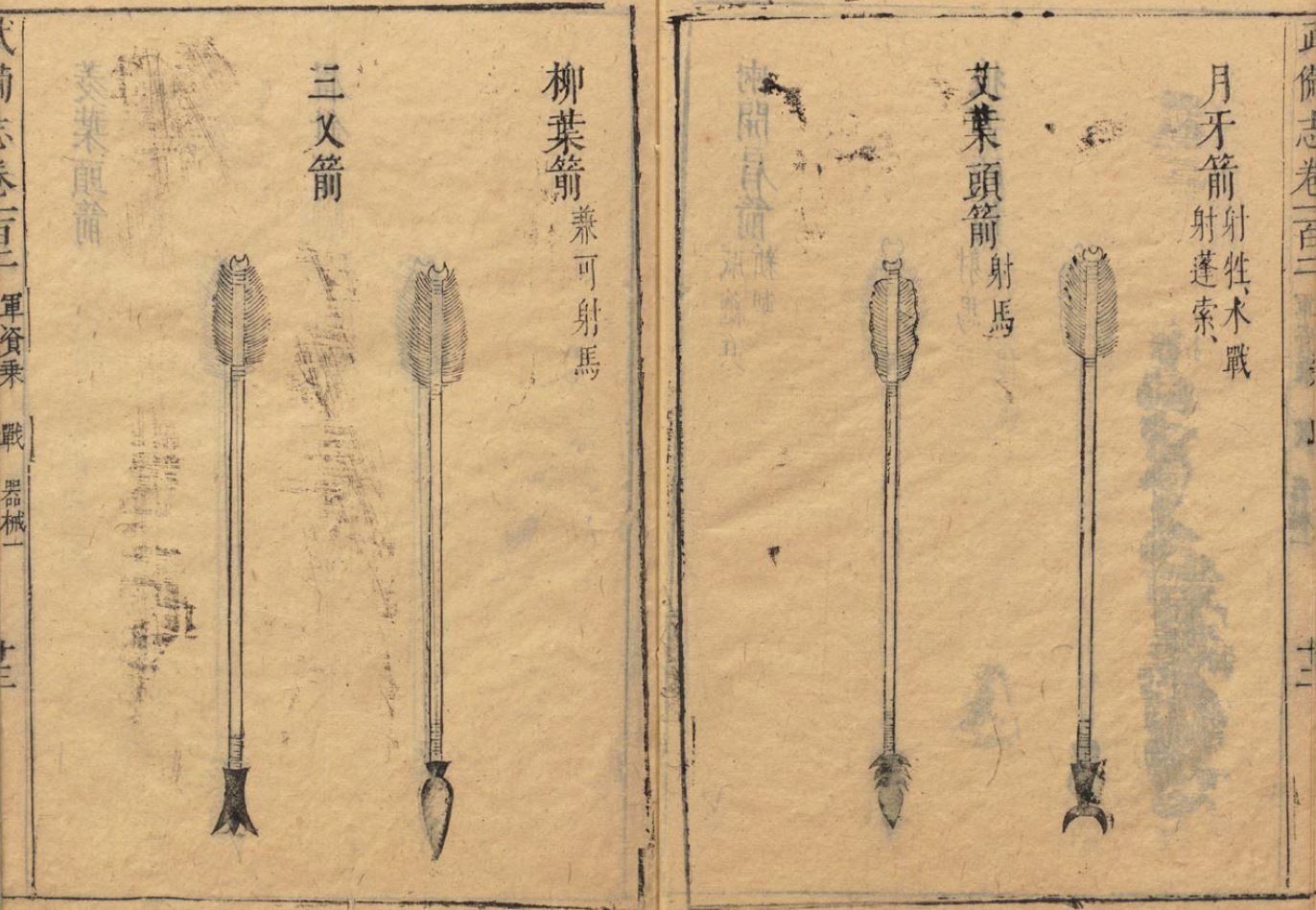

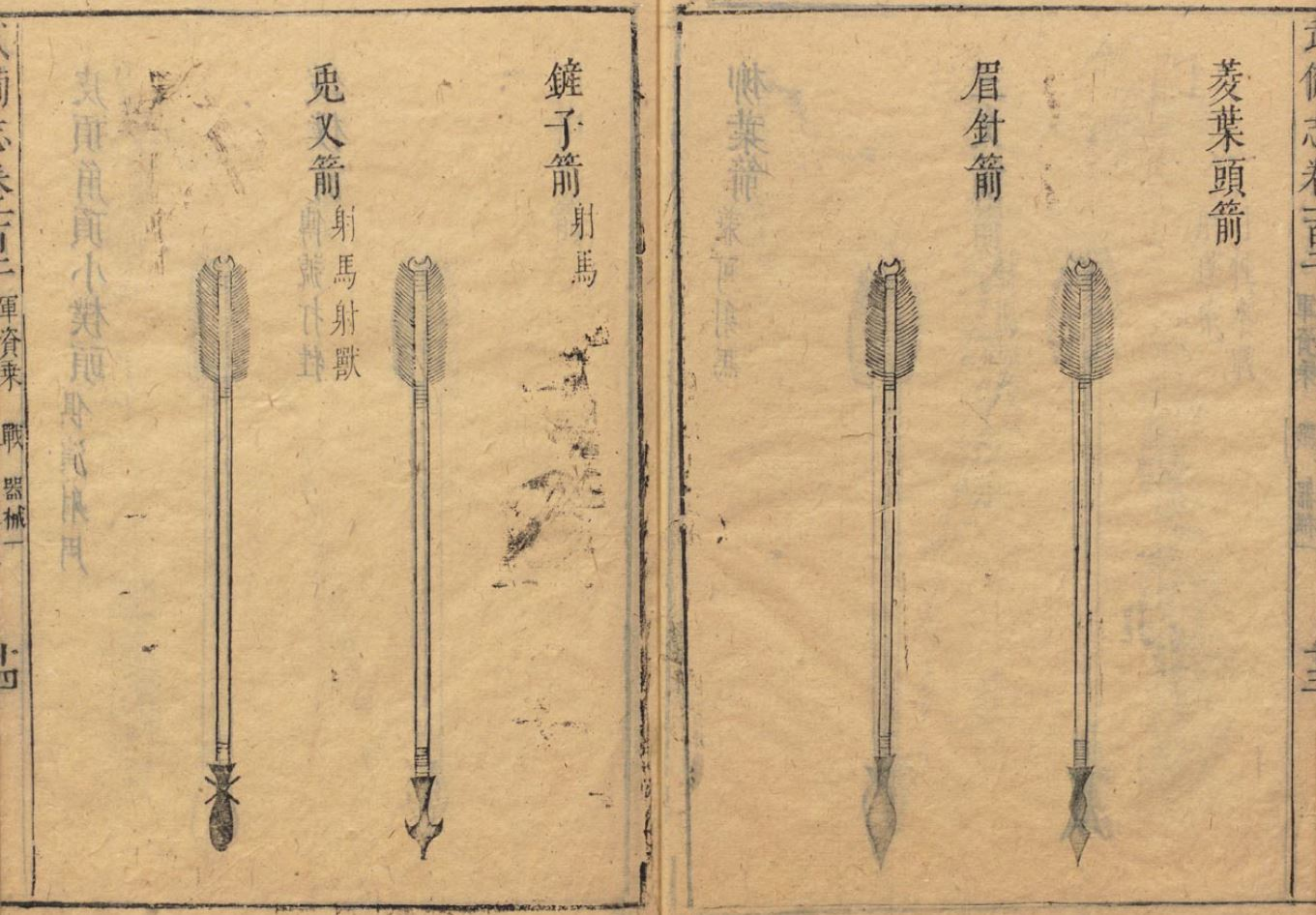

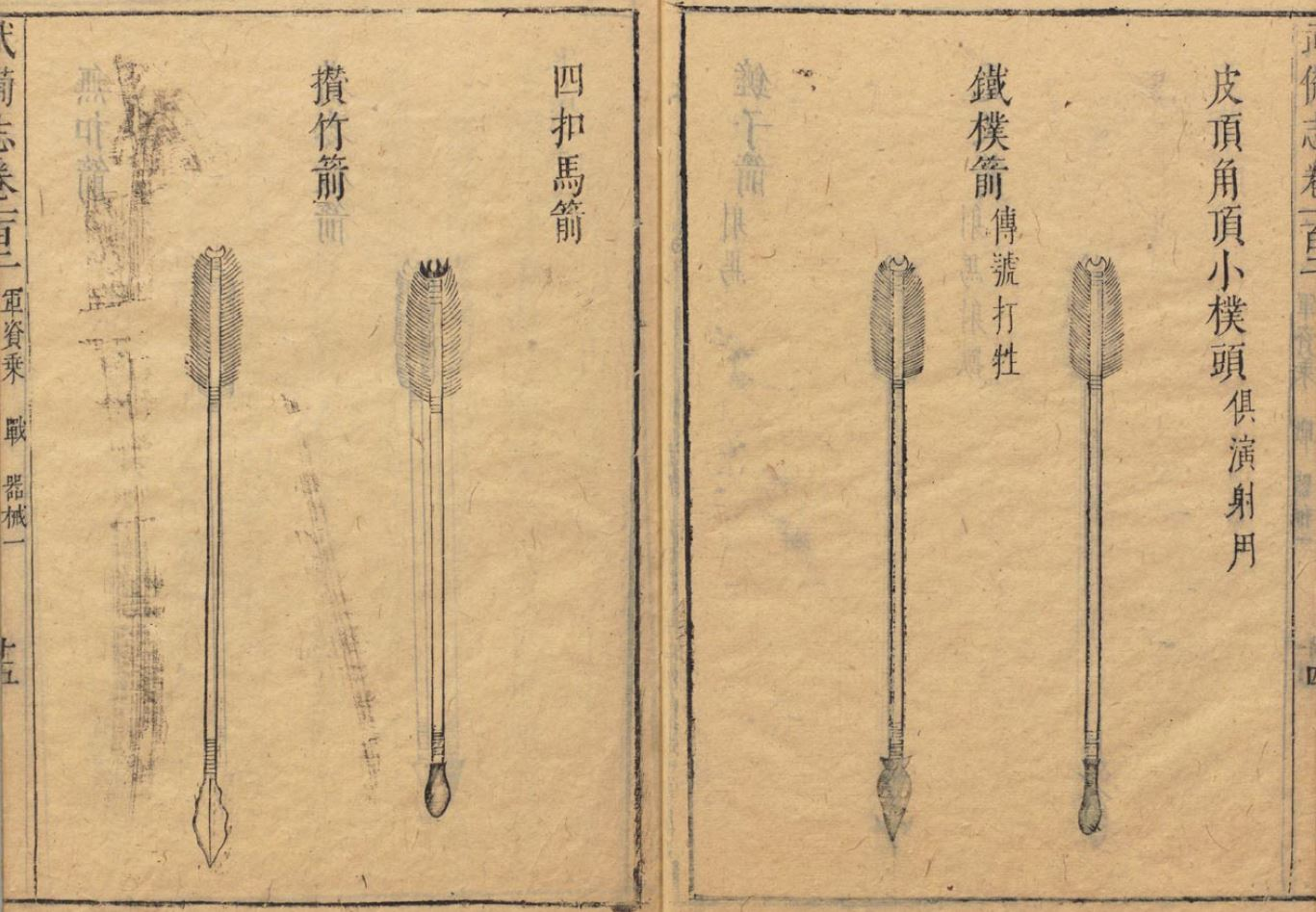

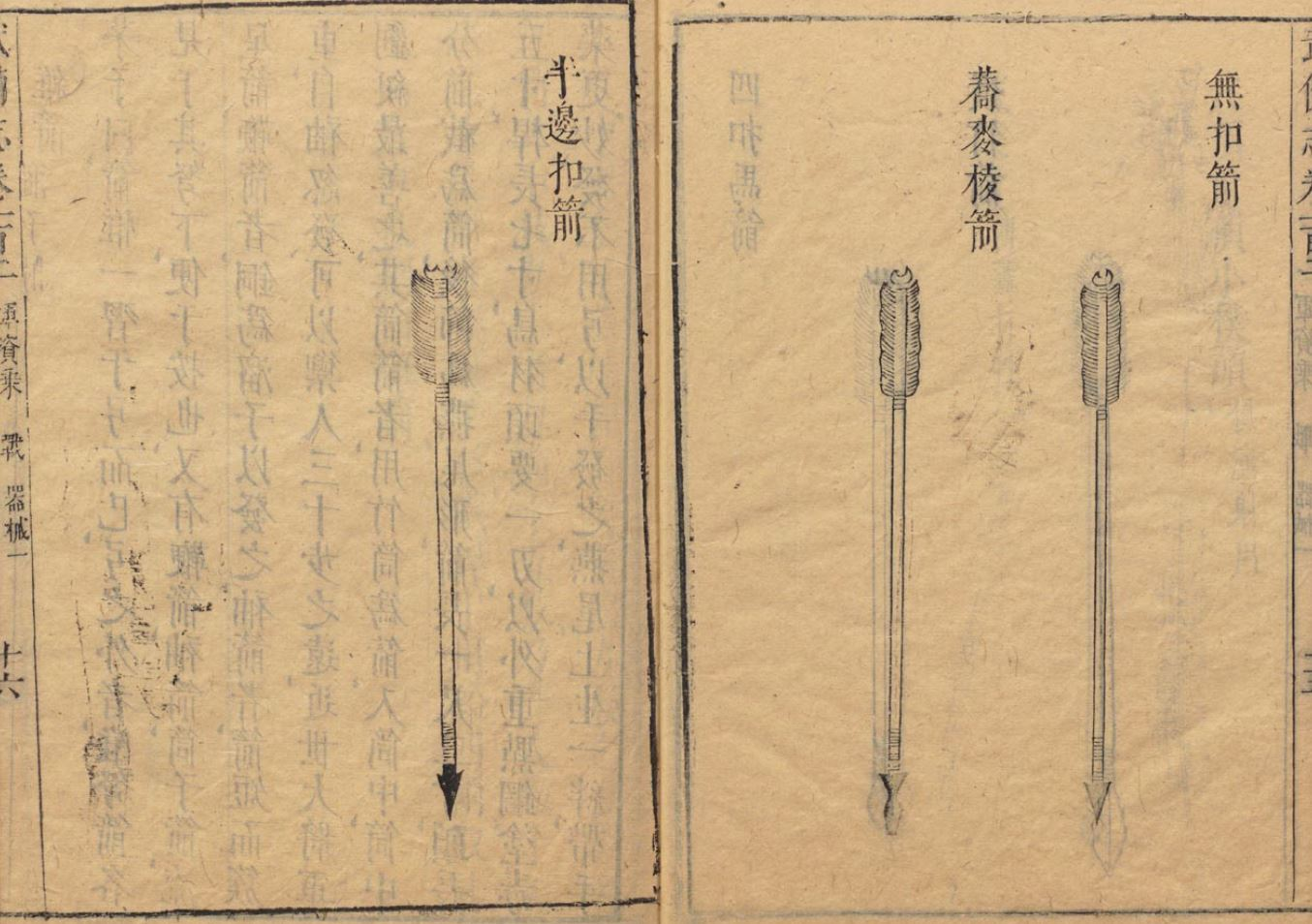

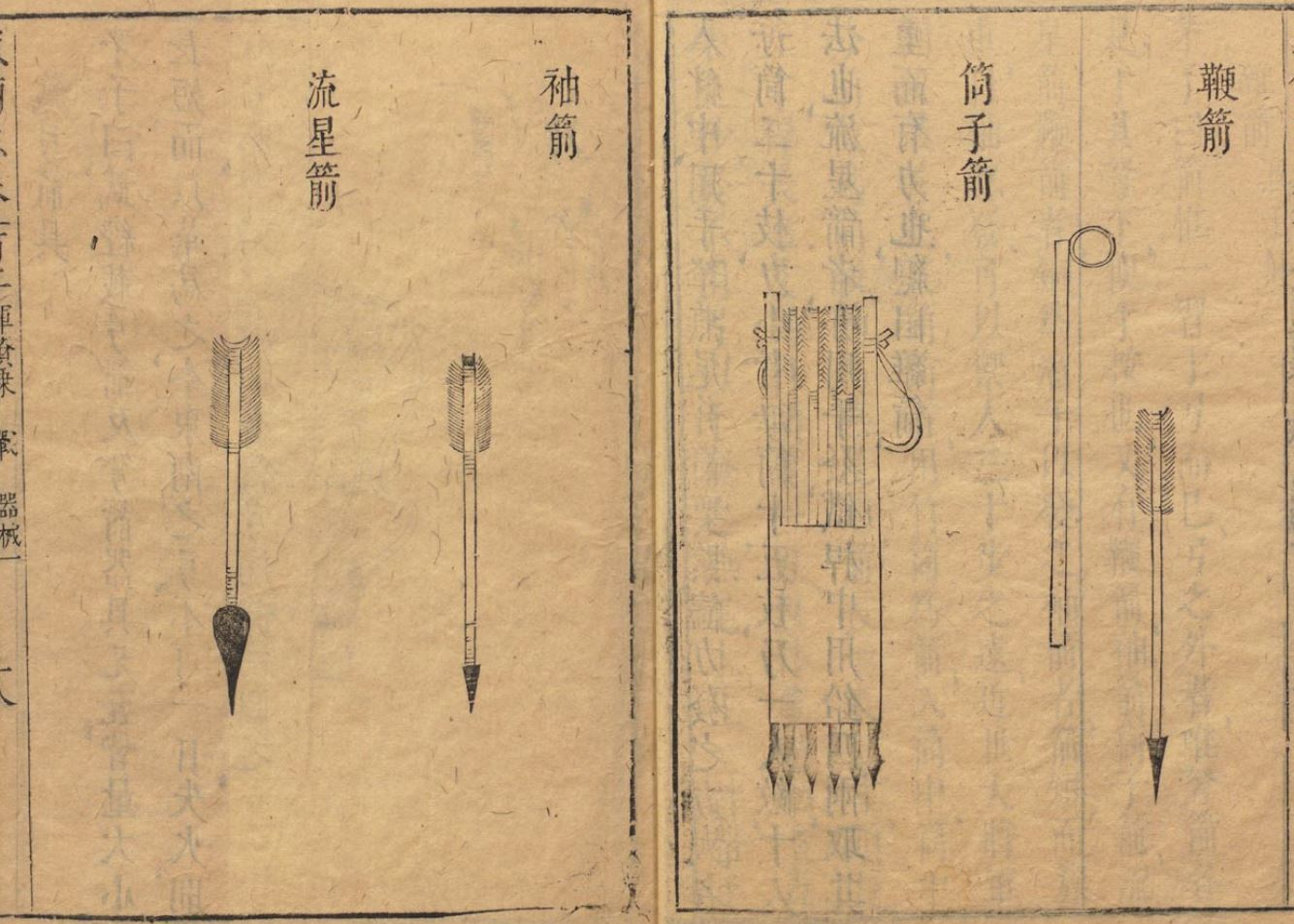

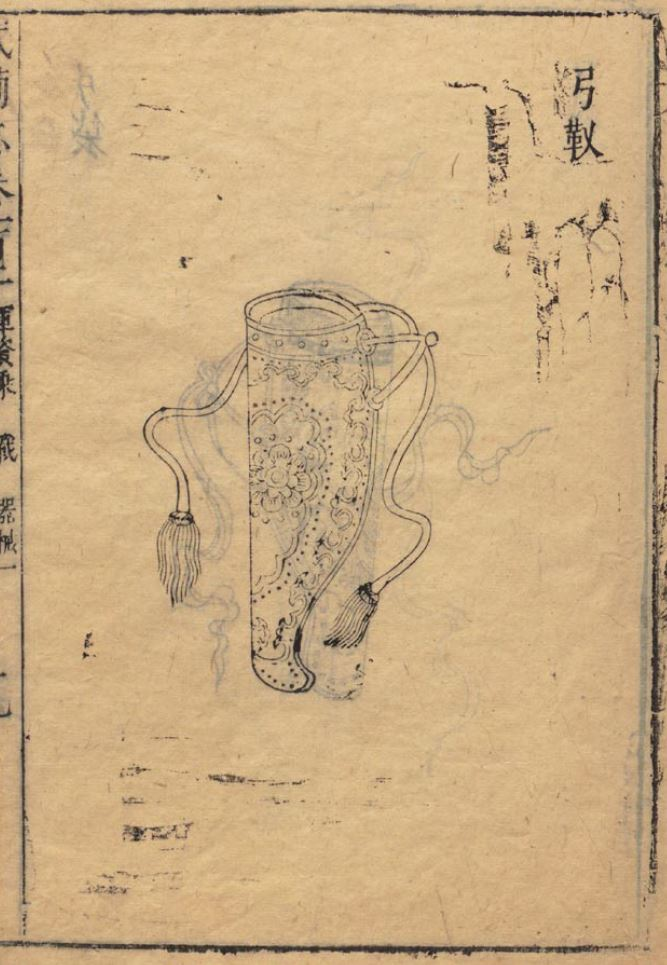

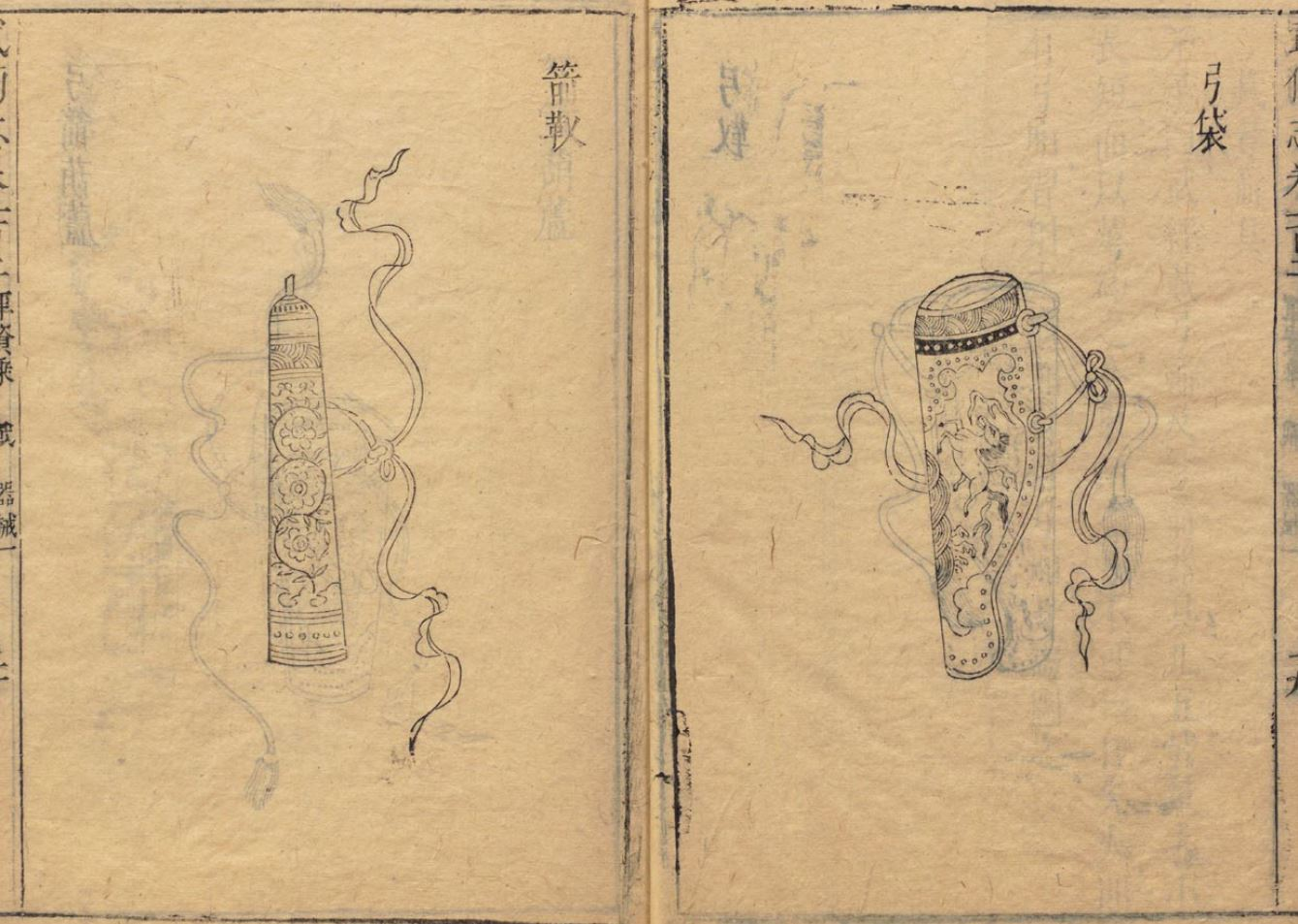

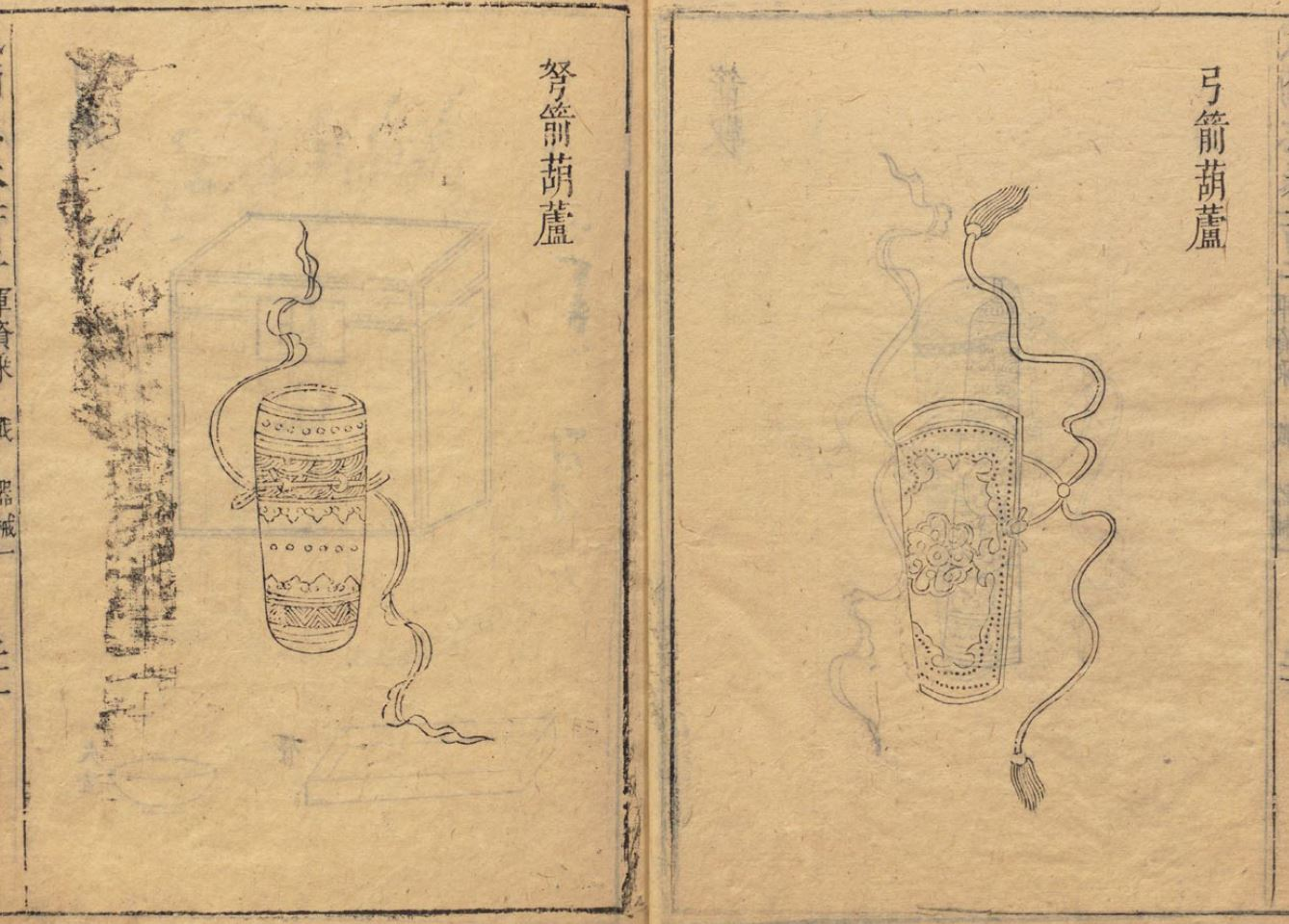

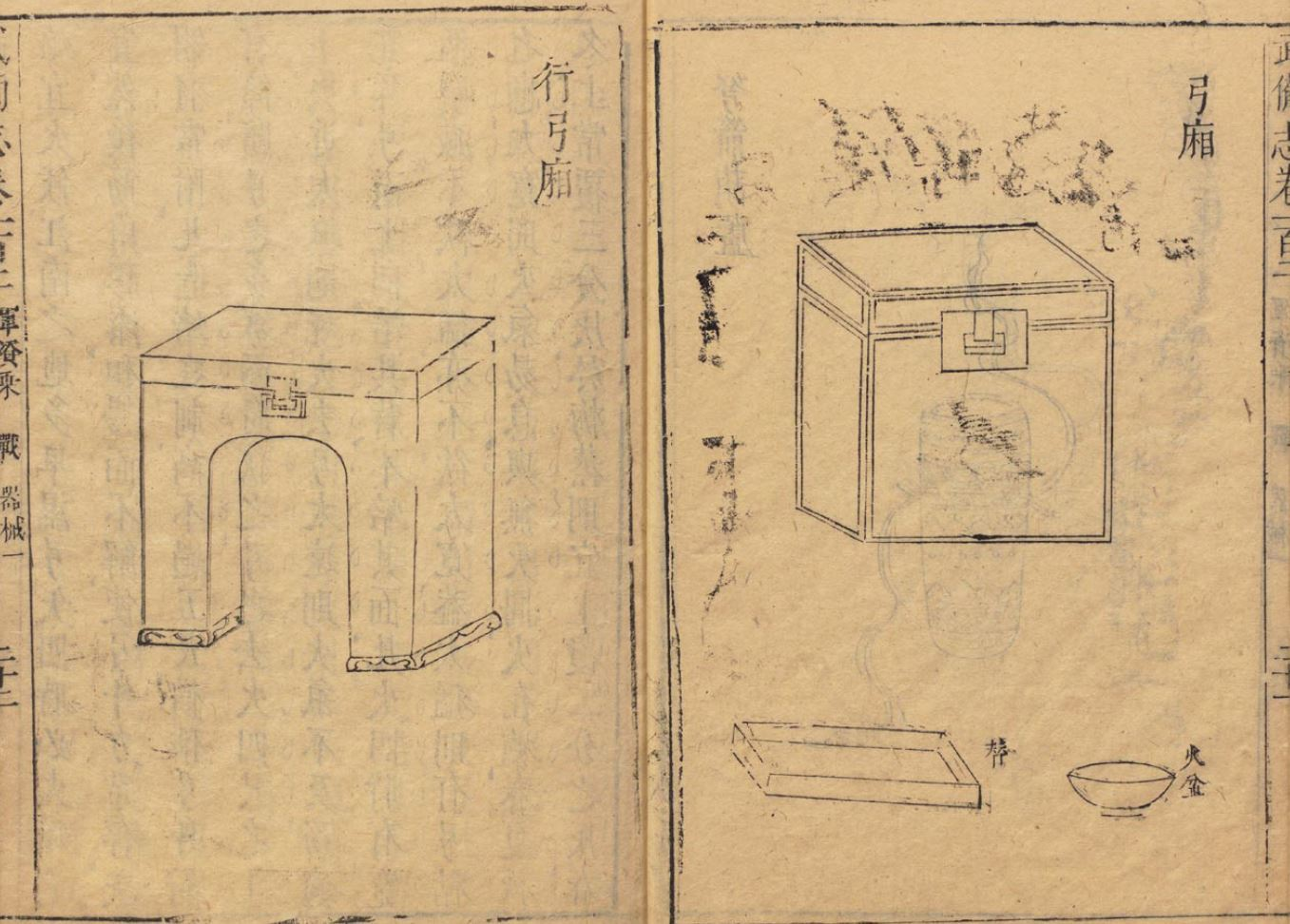

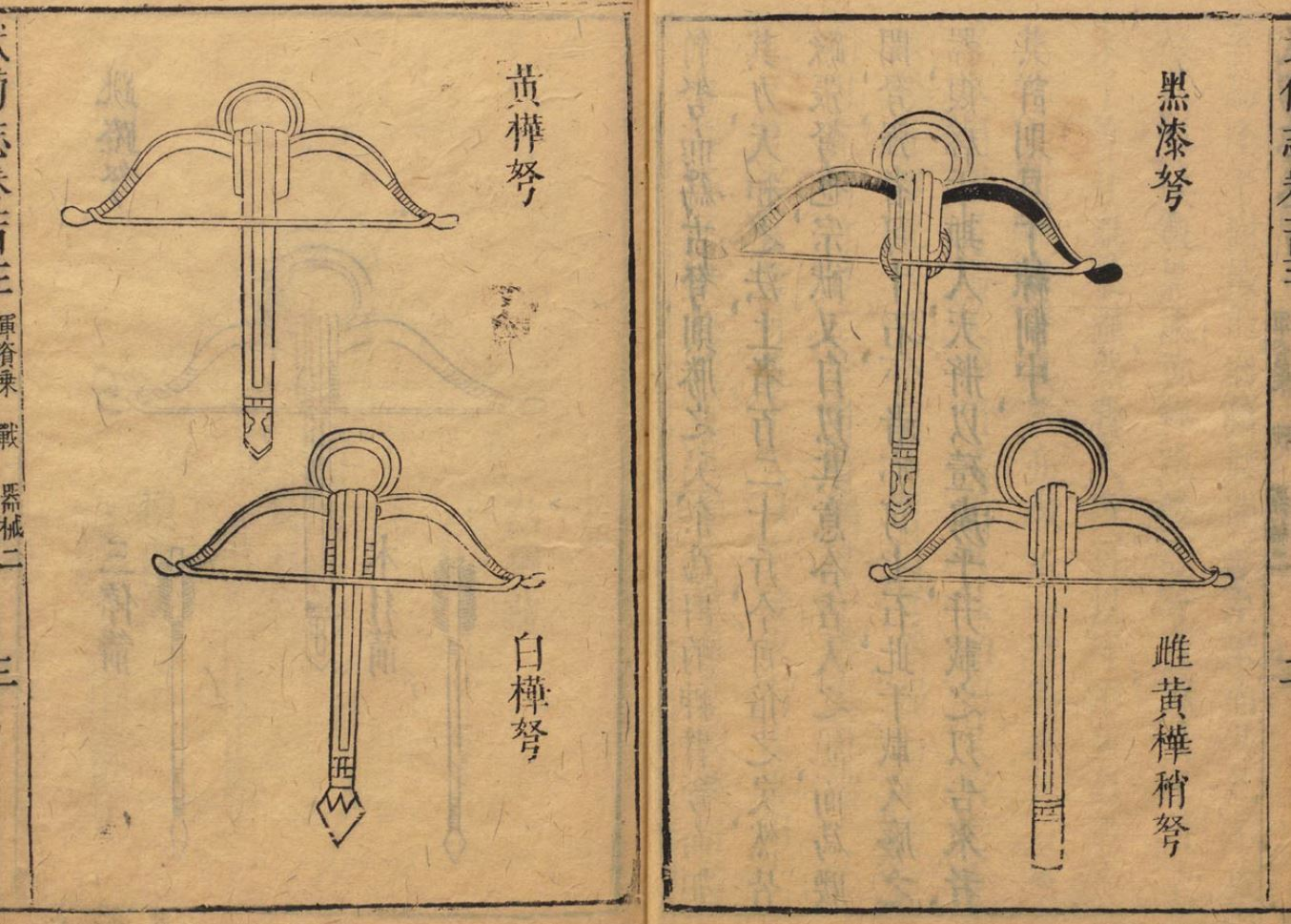

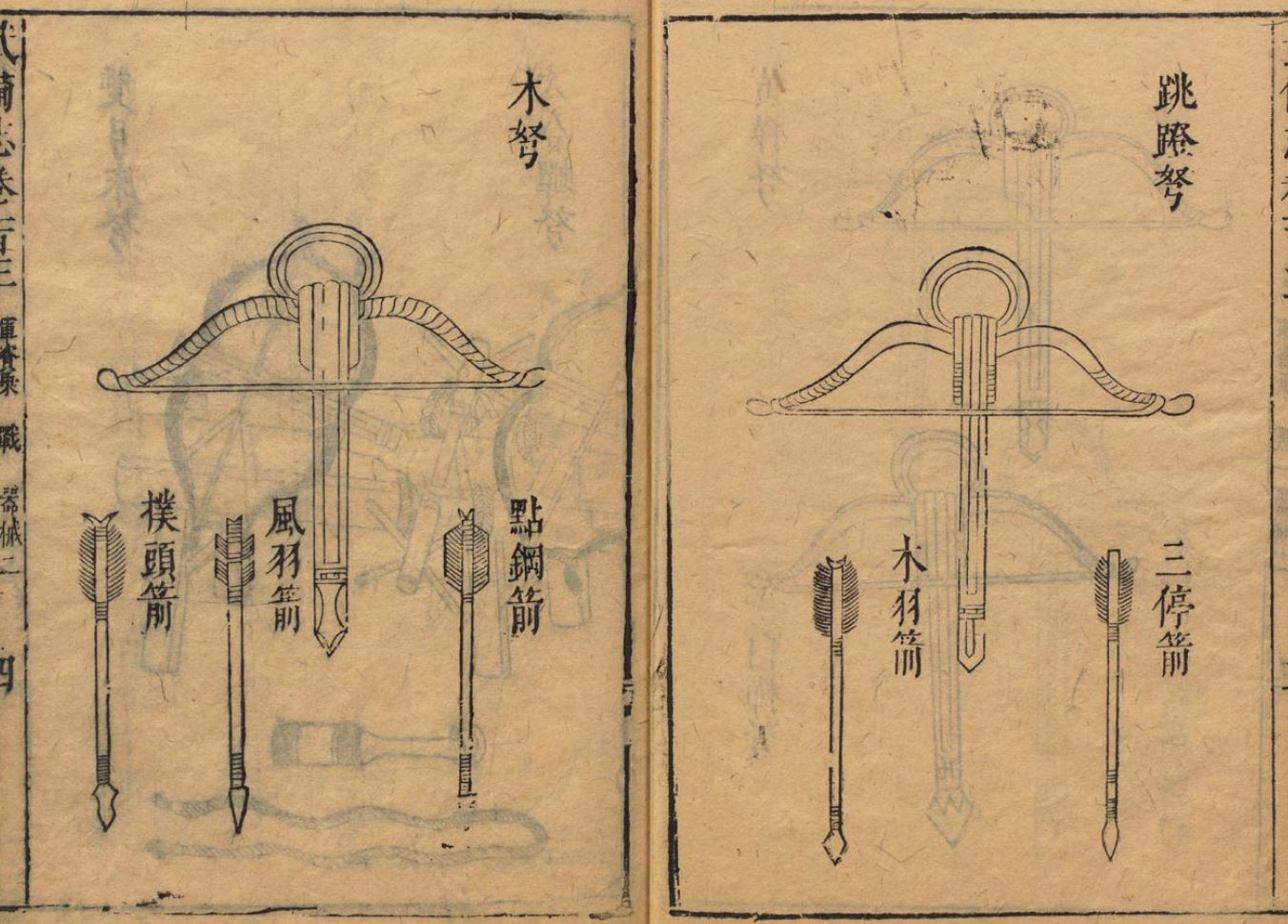

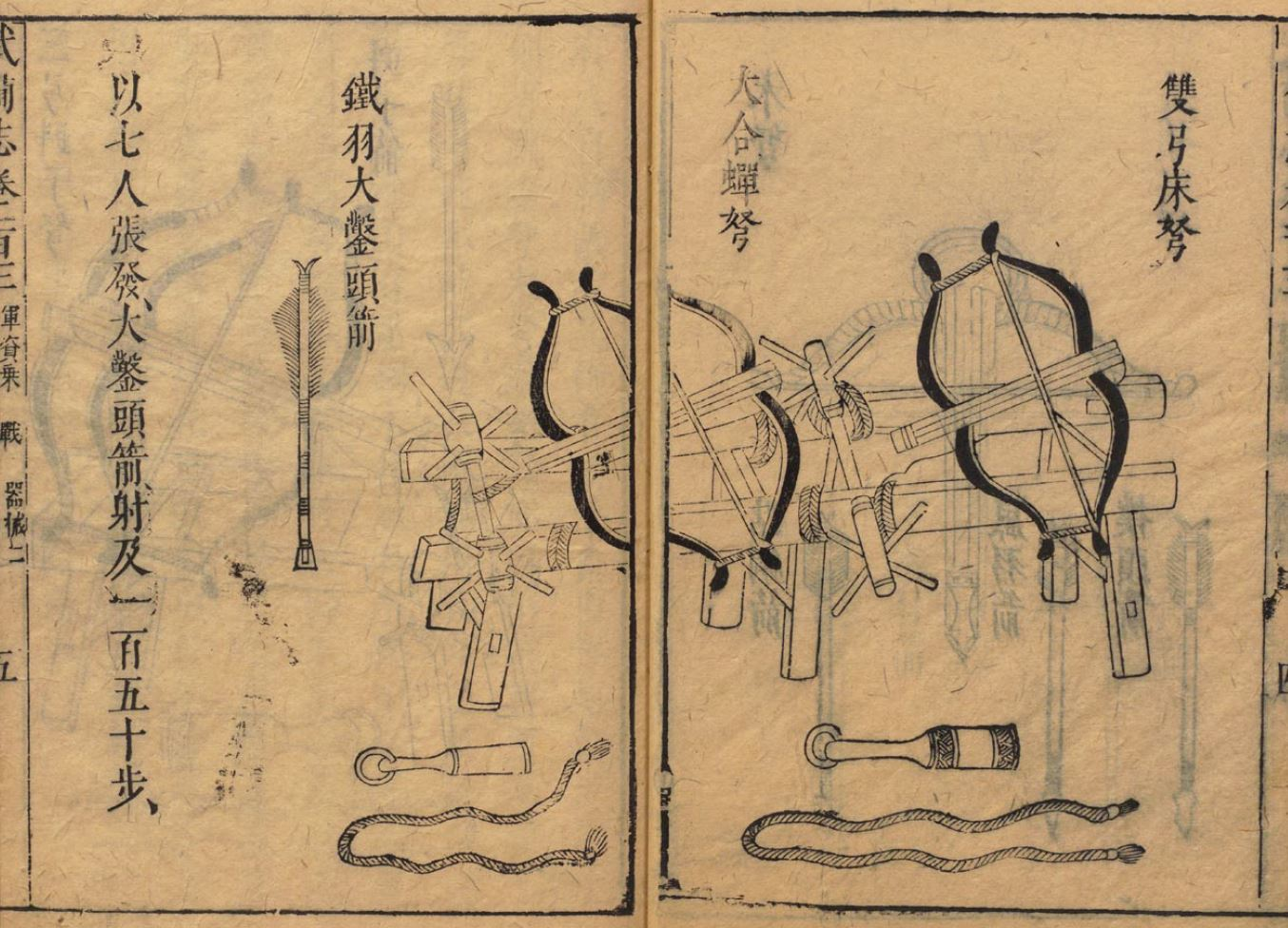

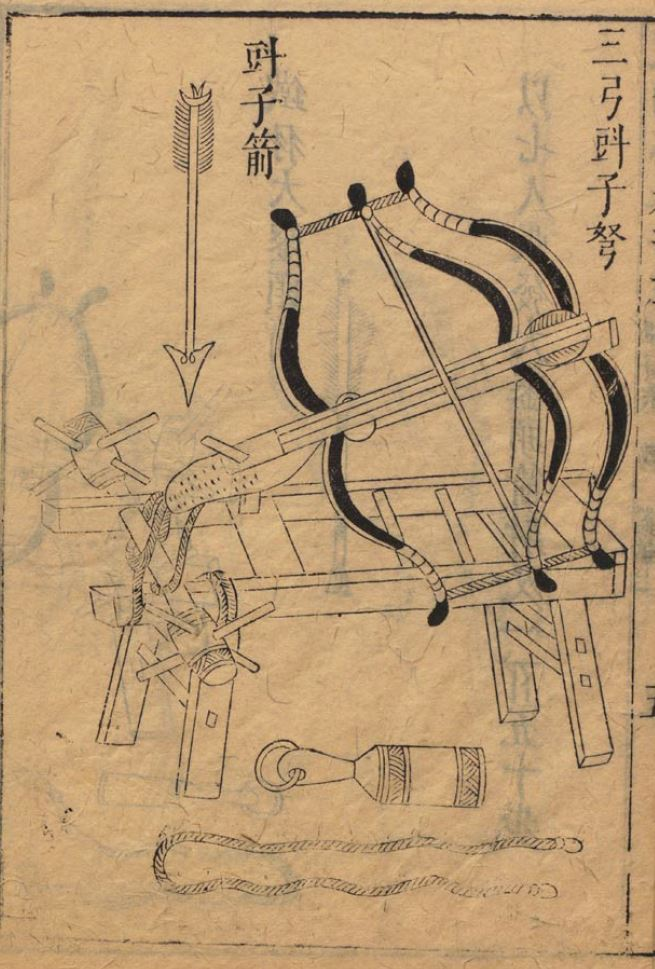

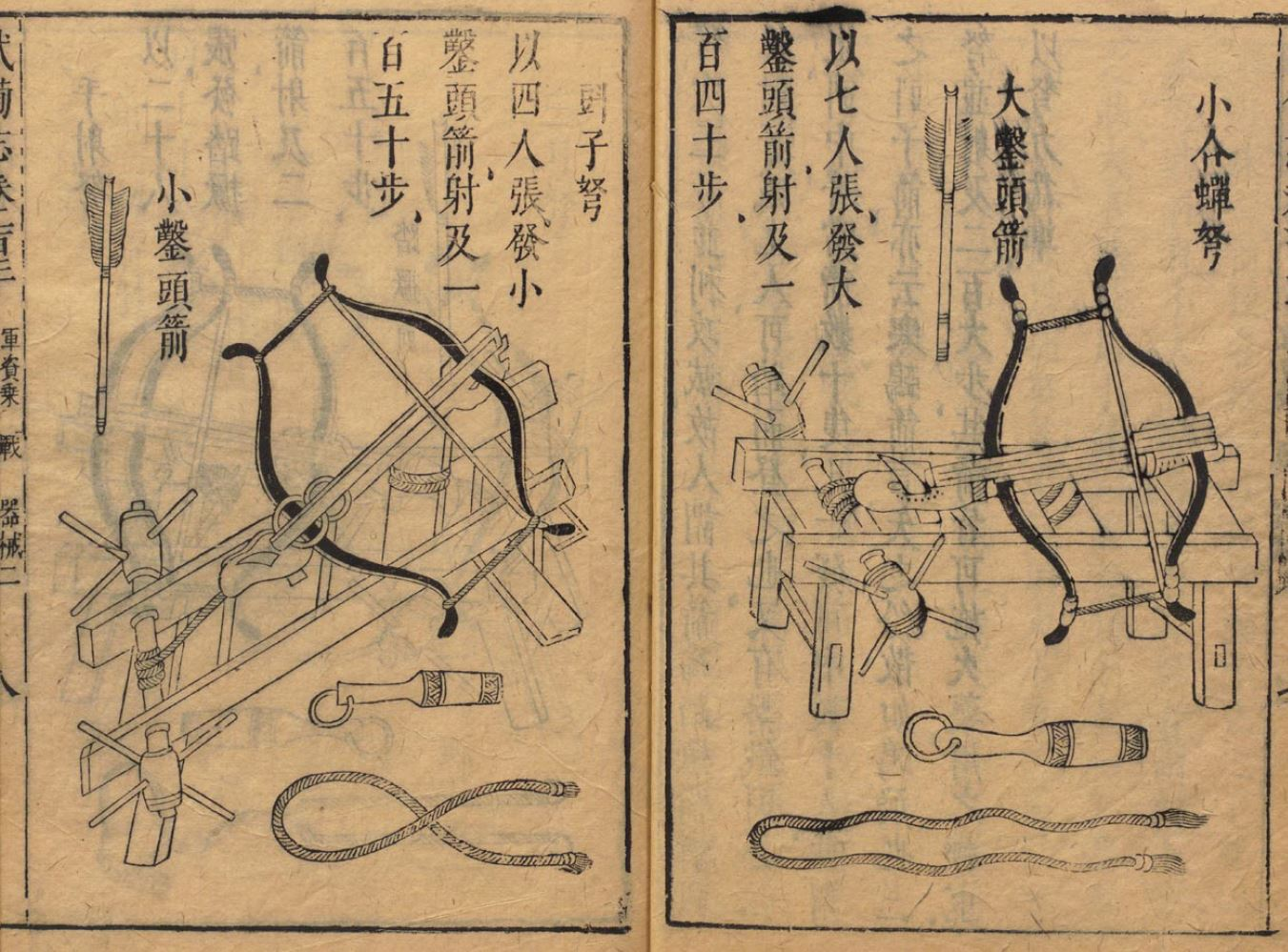

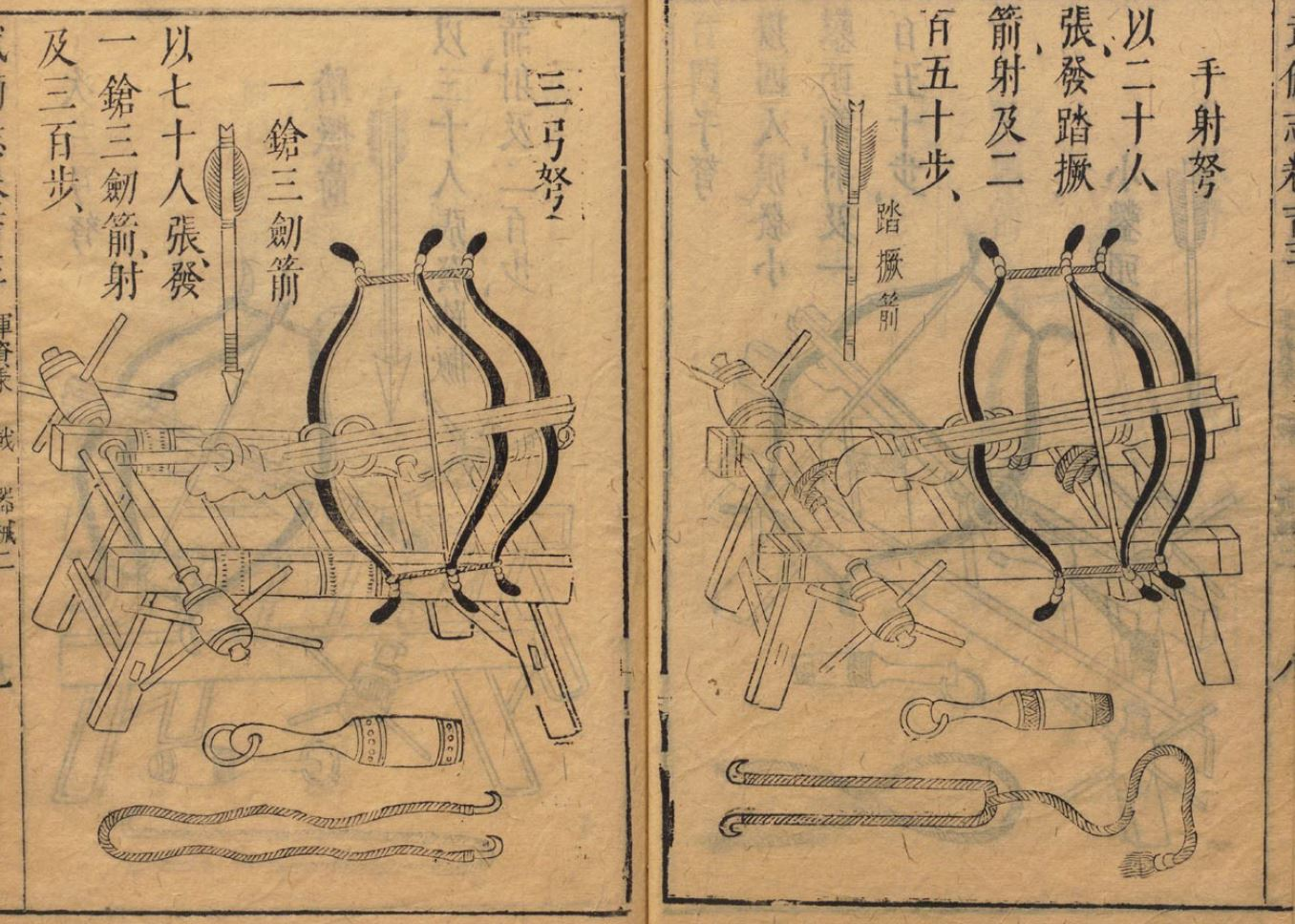

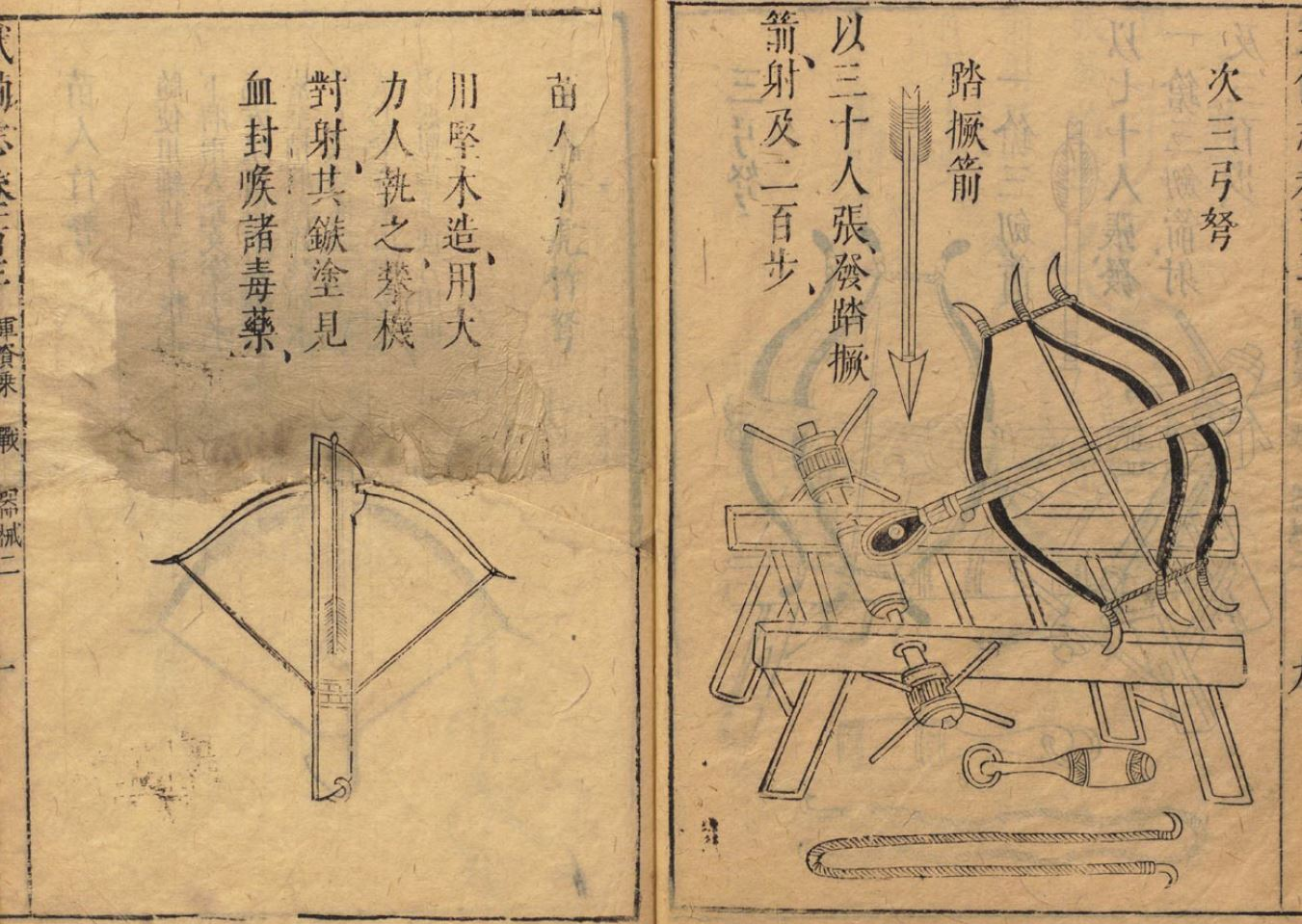

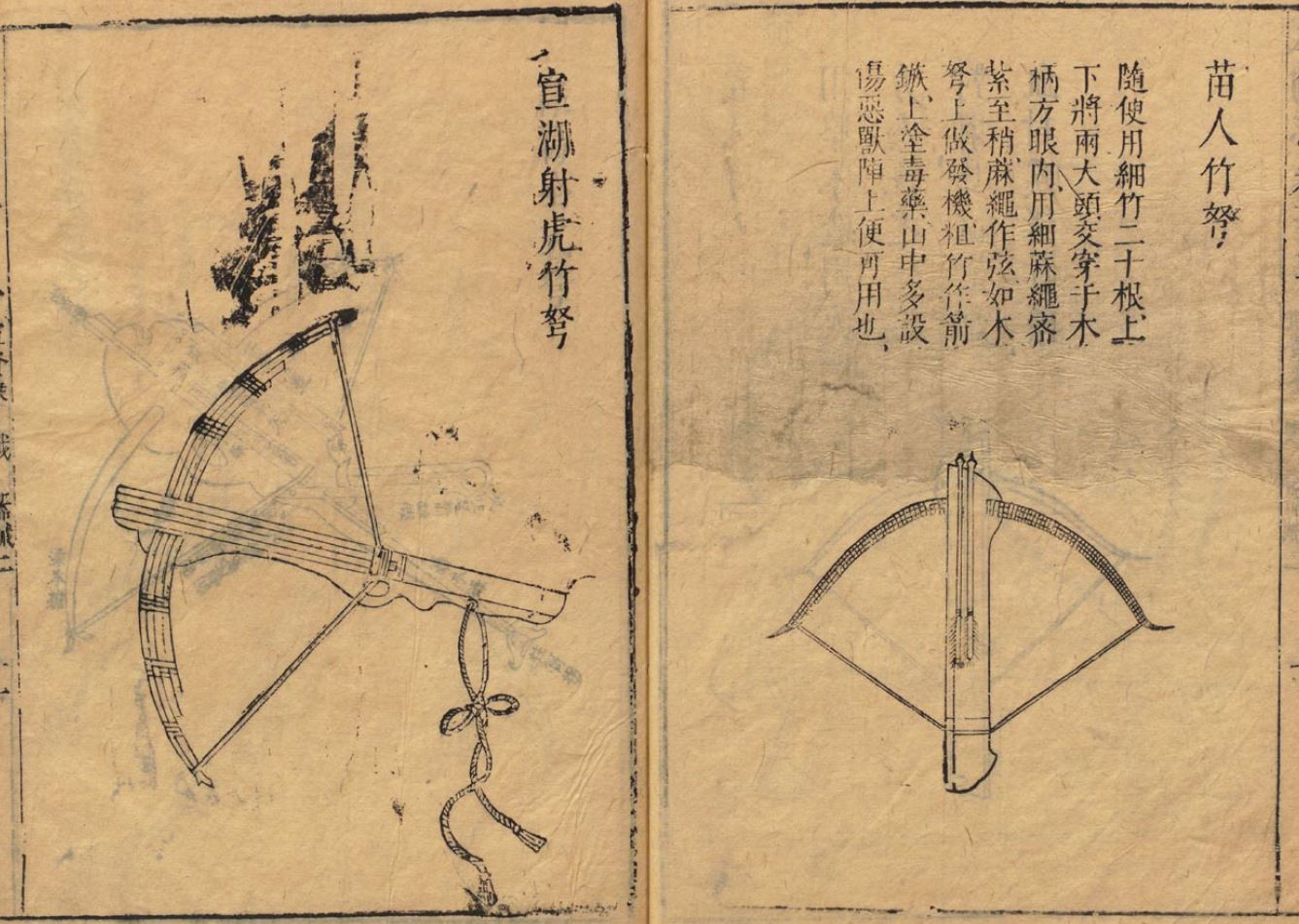

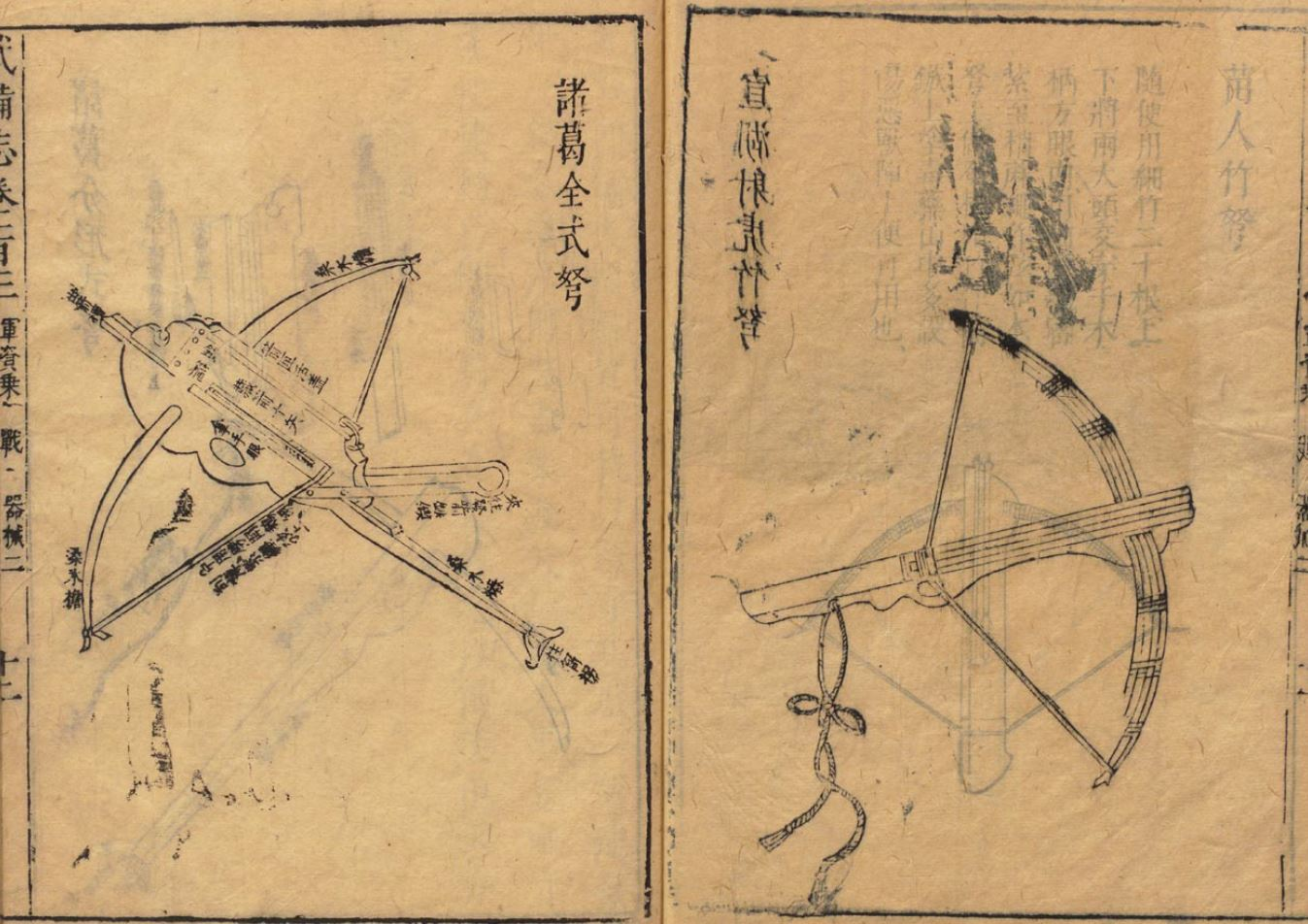

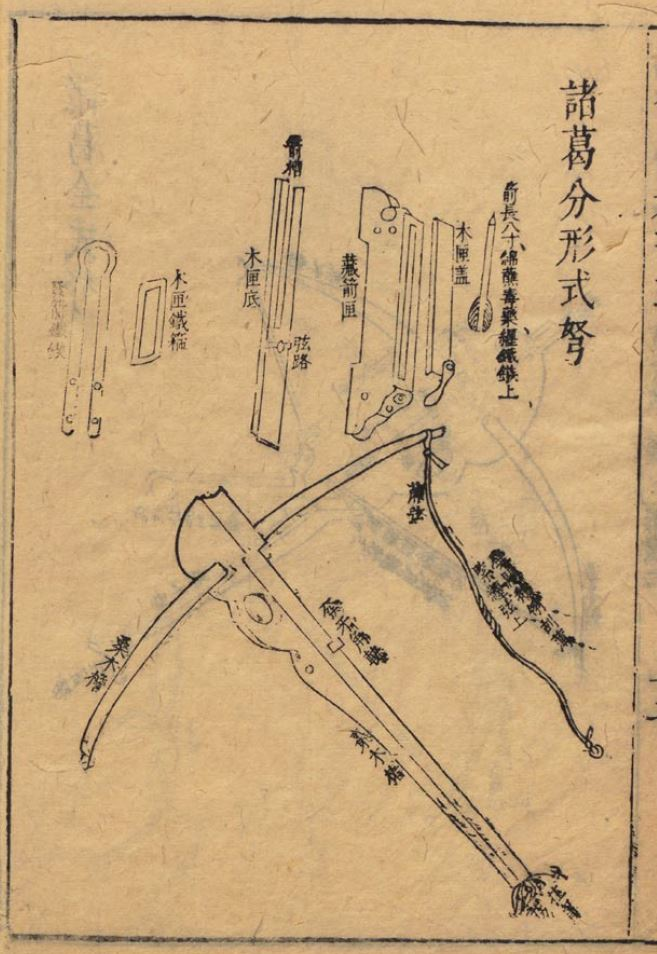

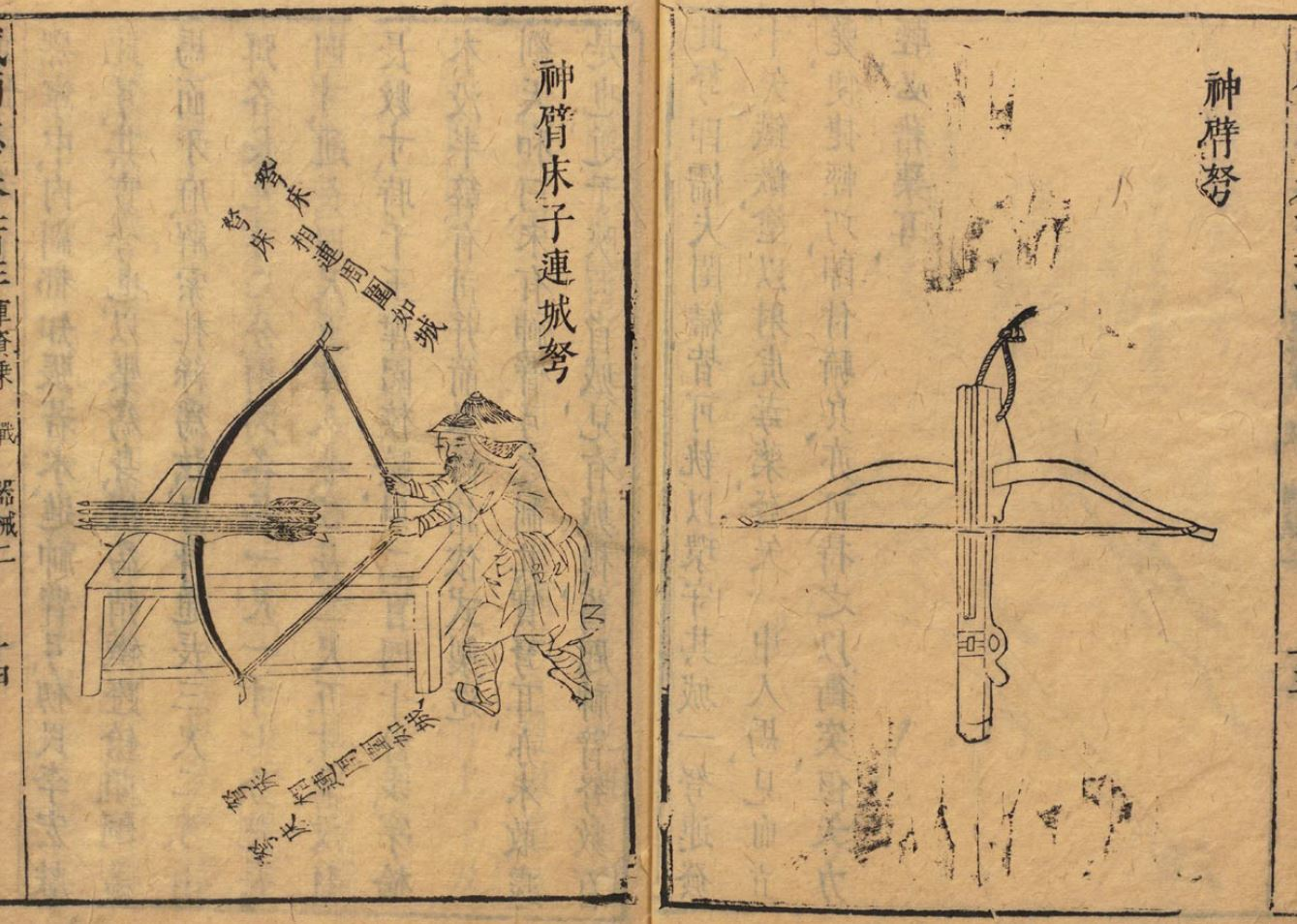

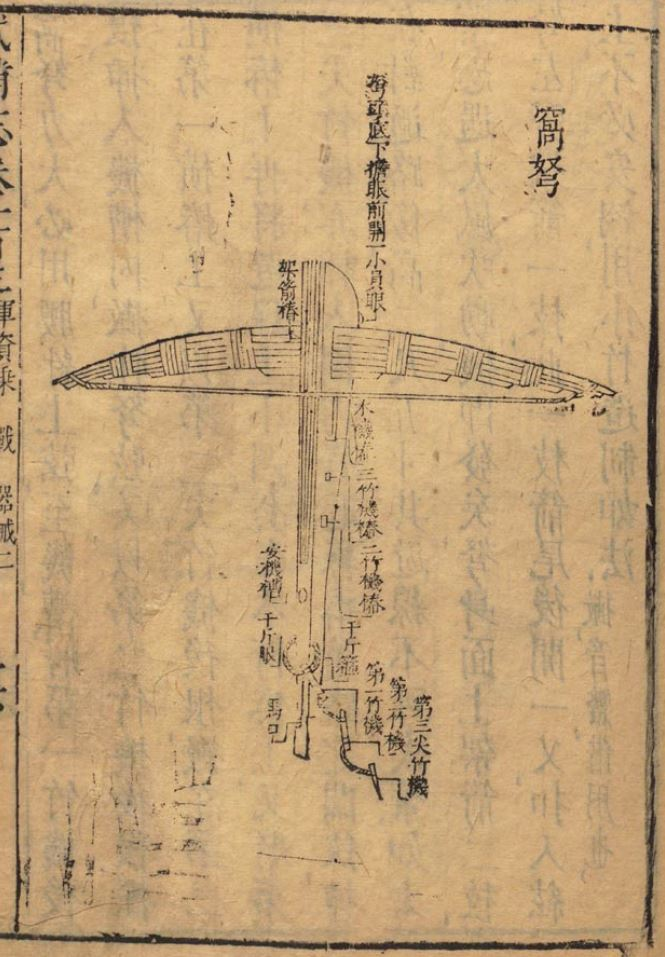

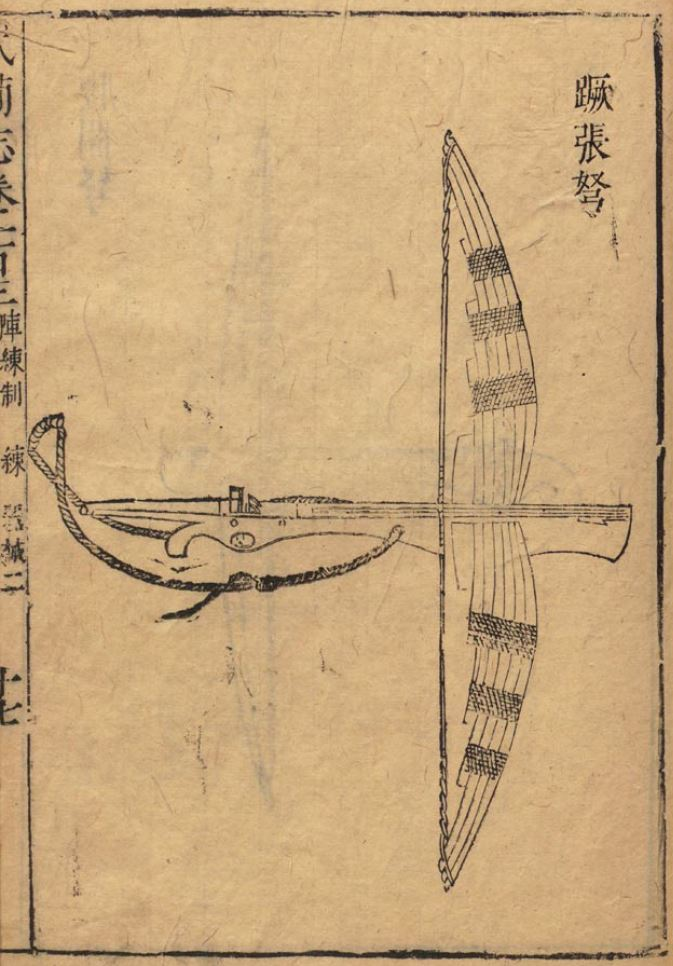

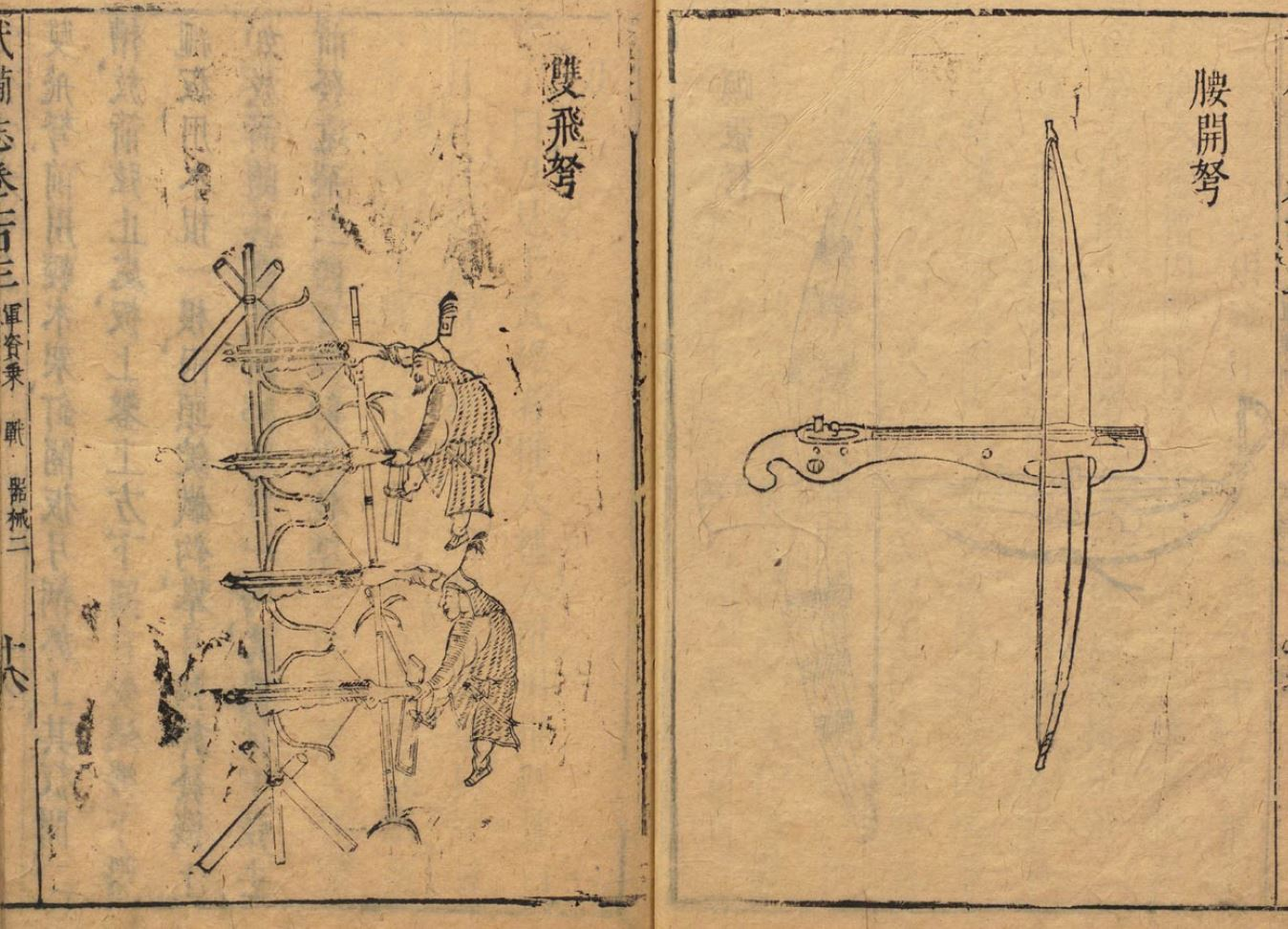

=== Fire arrows and rockets ===
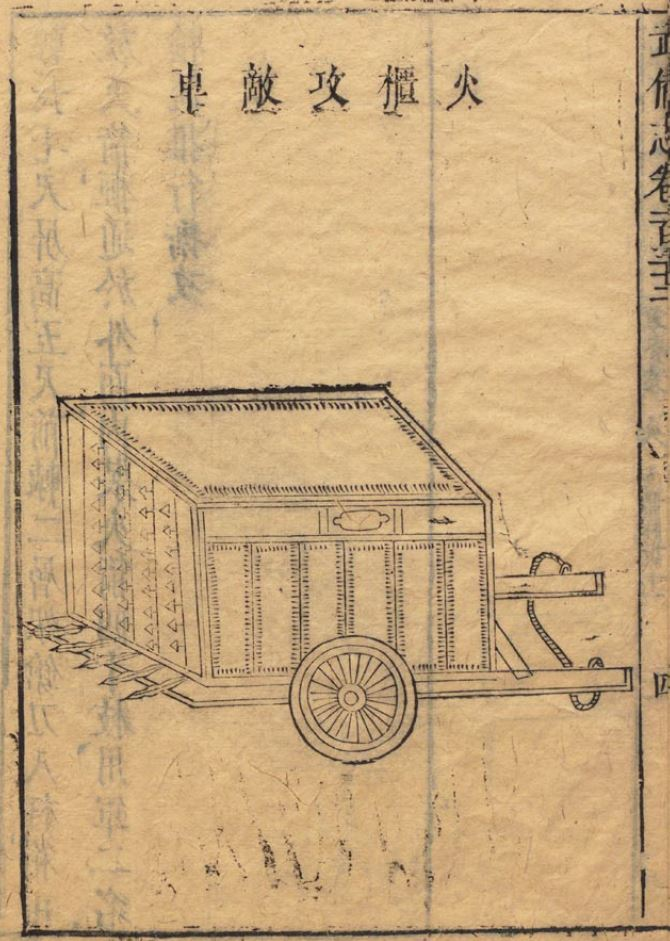

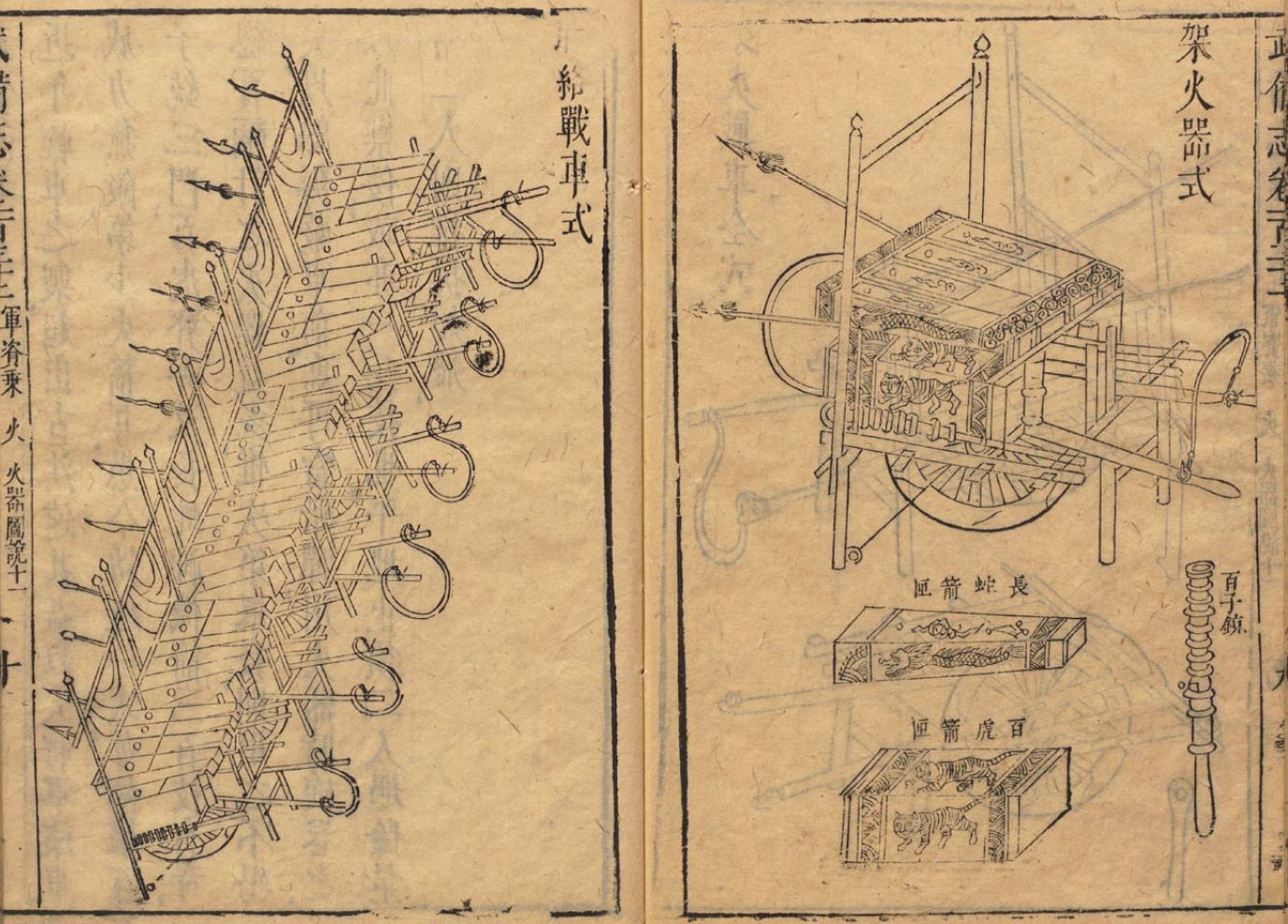

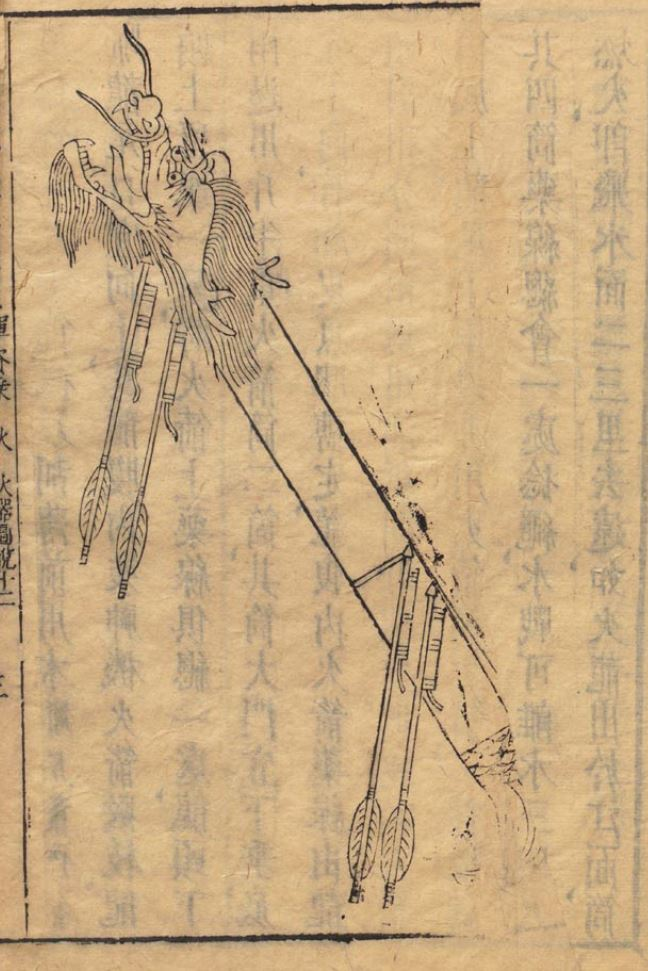

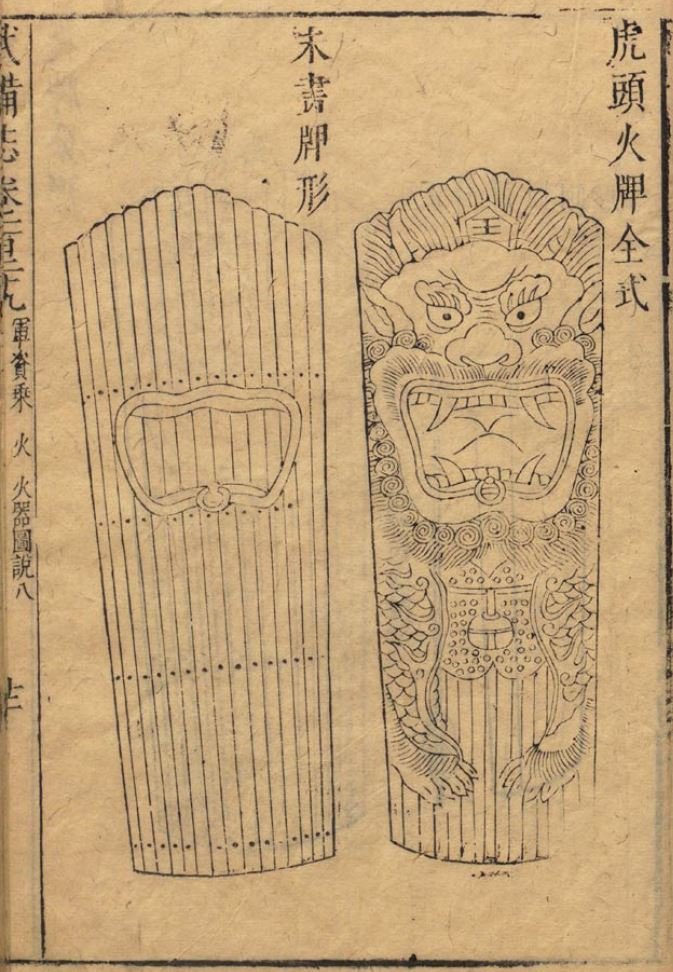

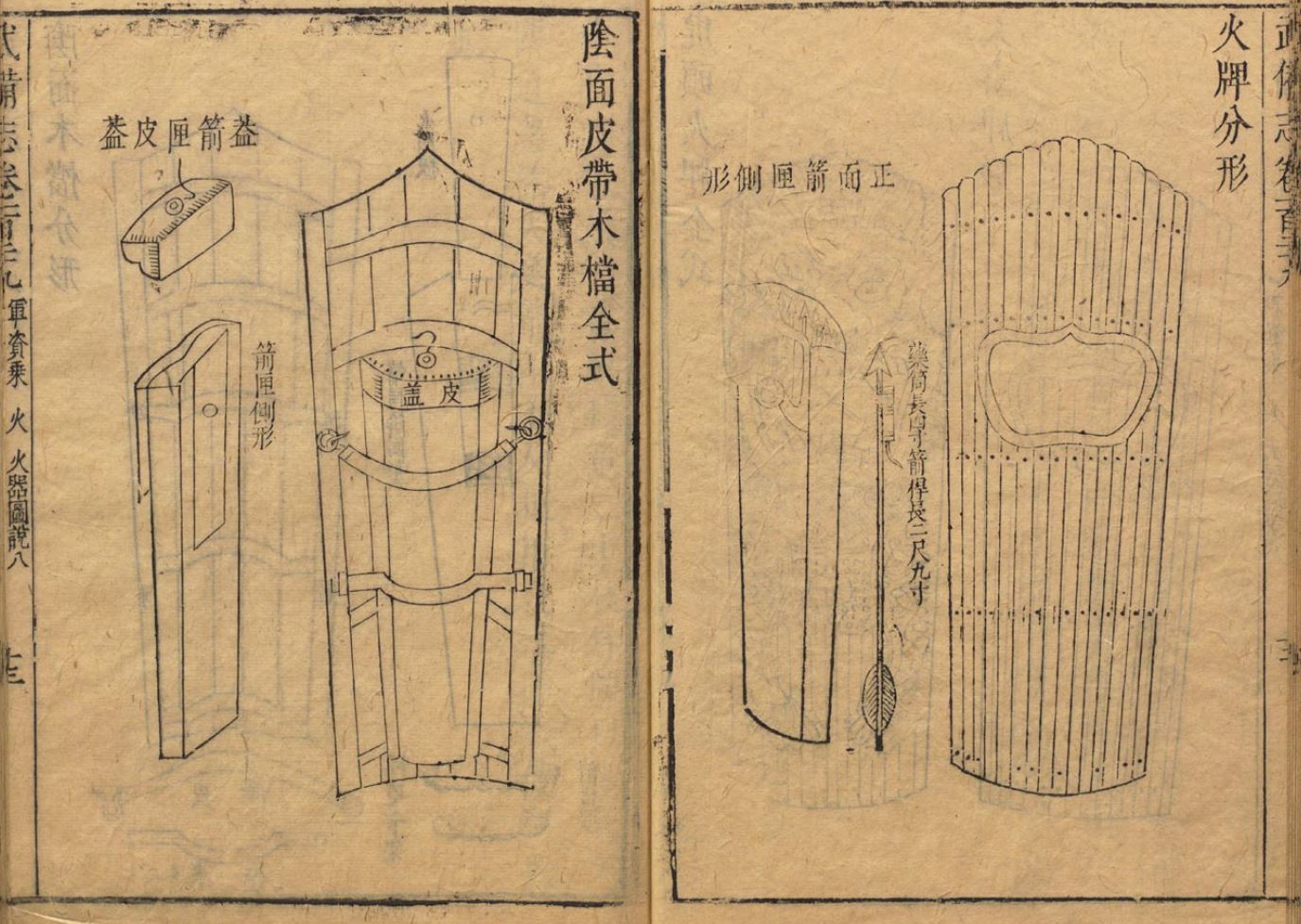

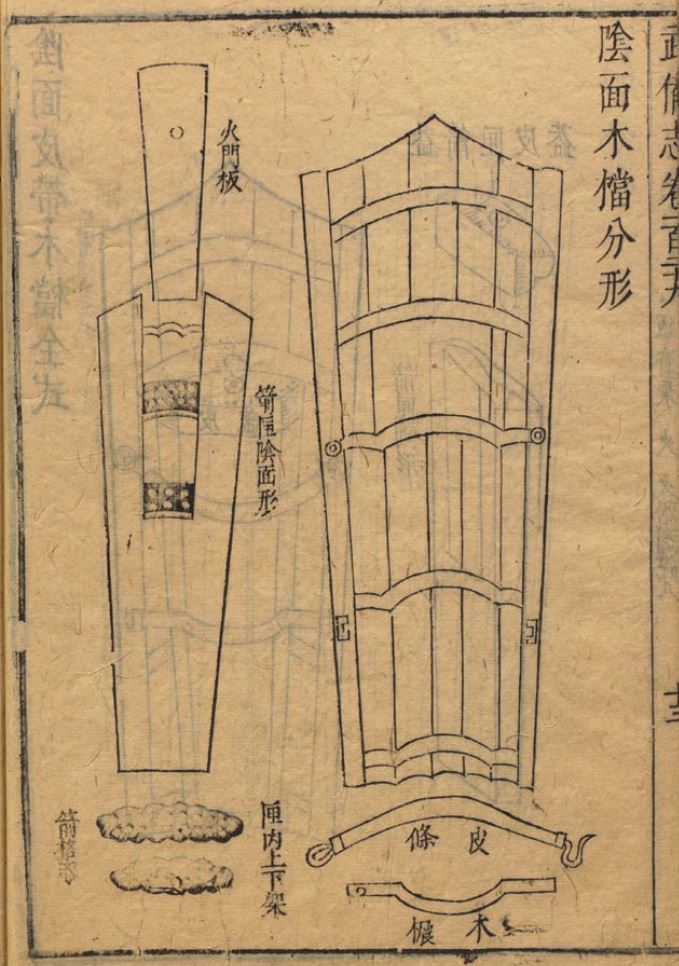

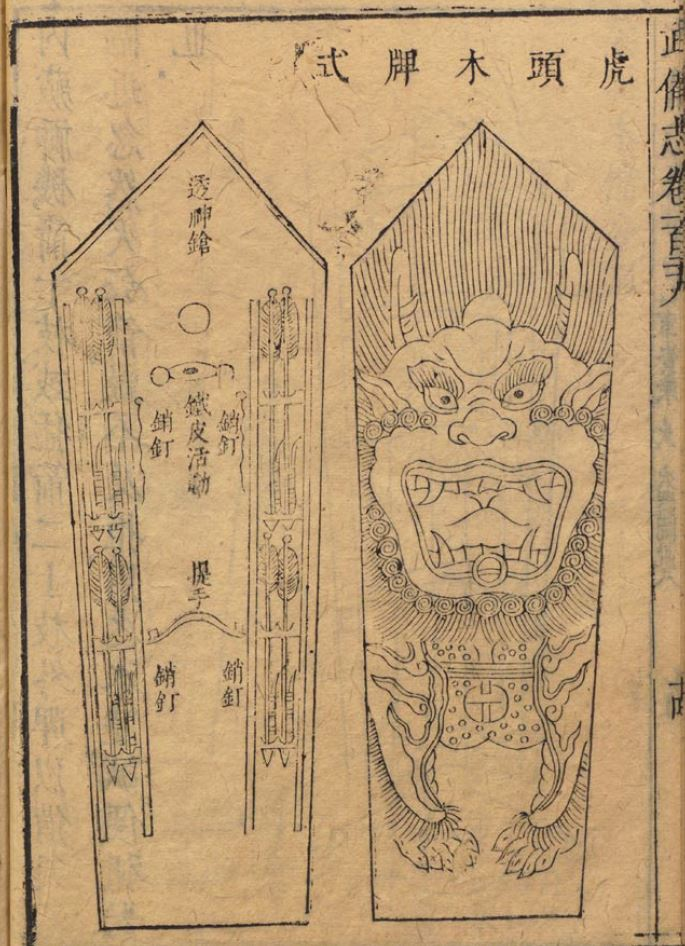

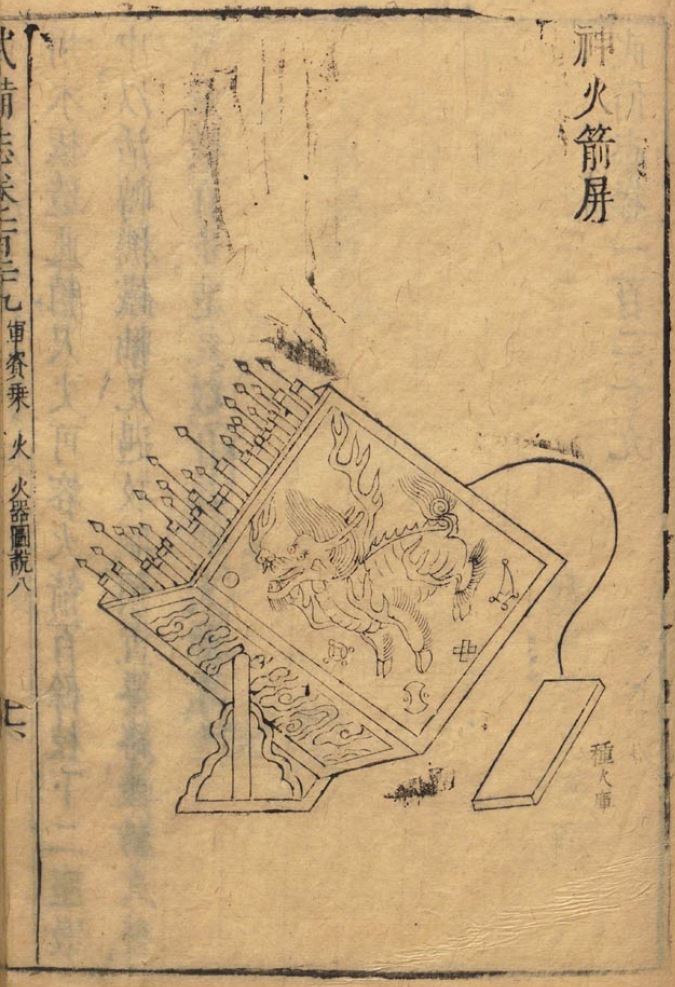

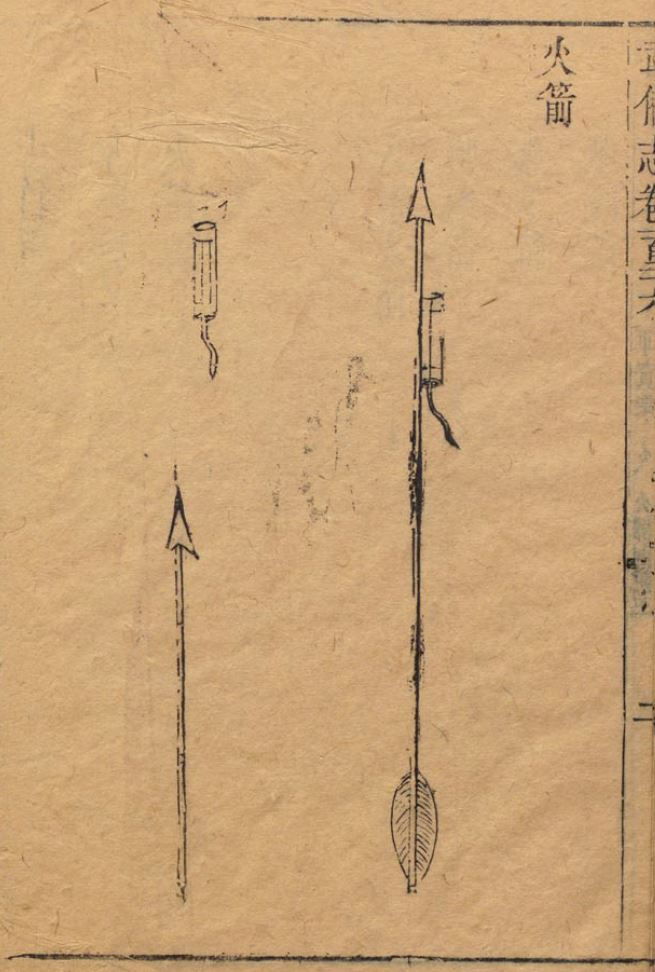

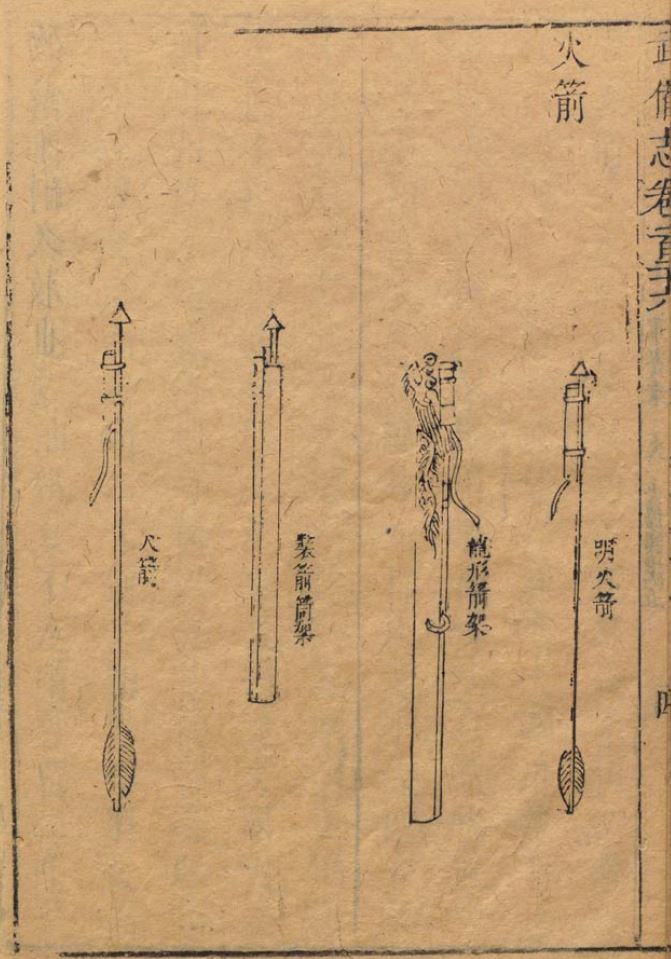

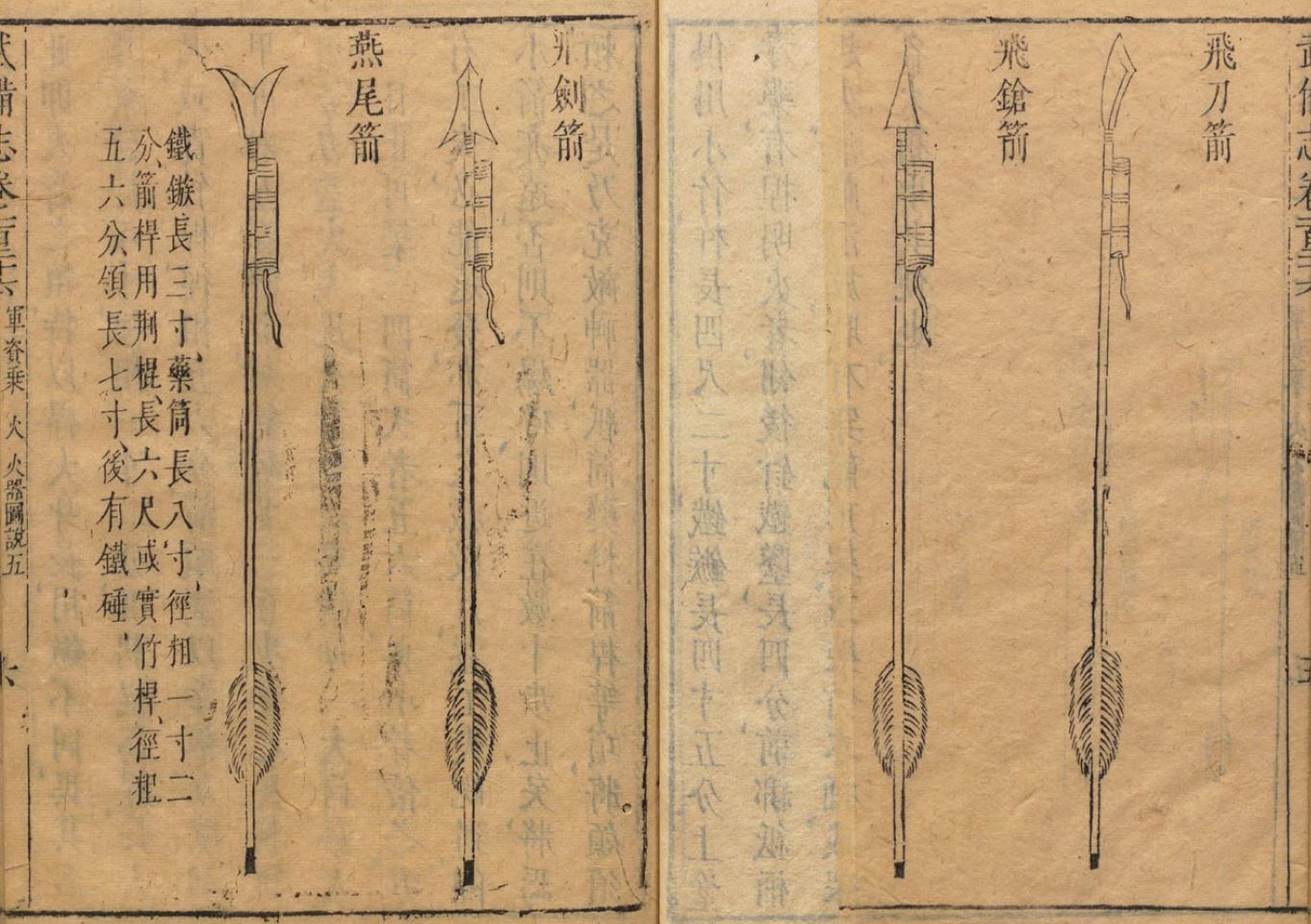

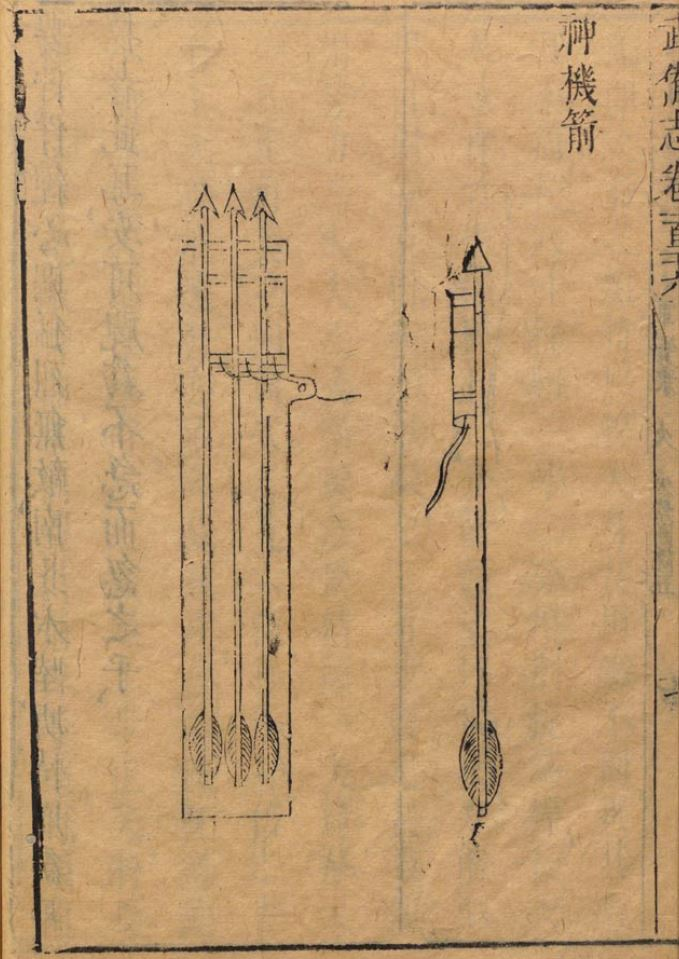

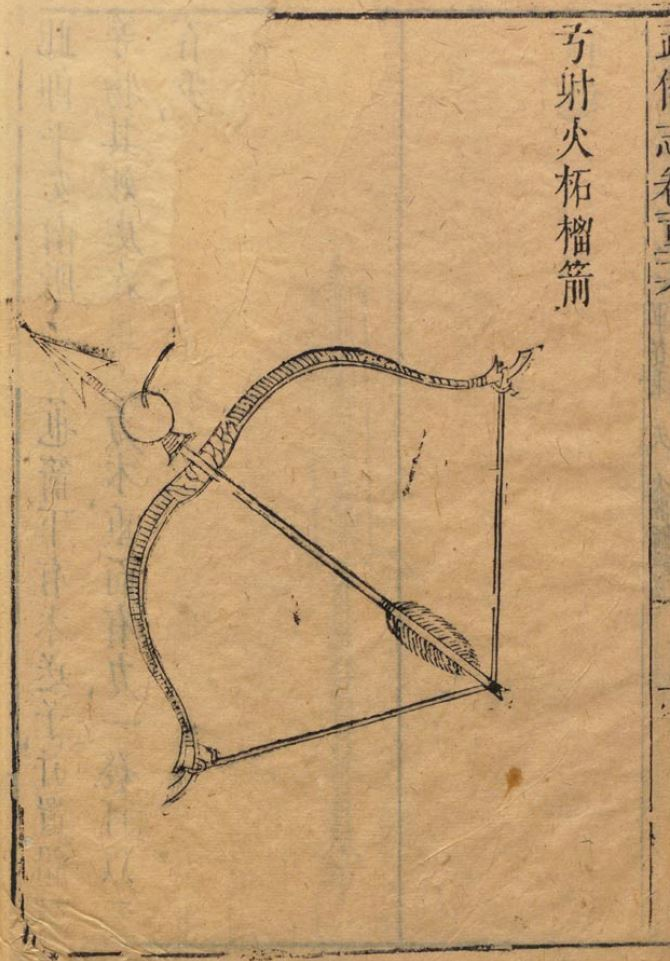

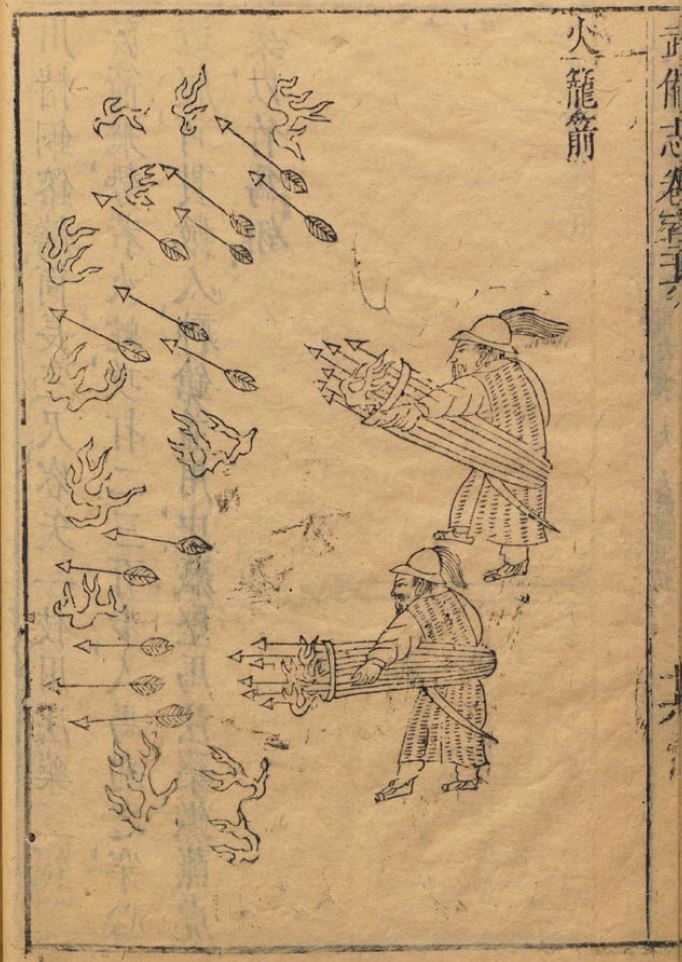

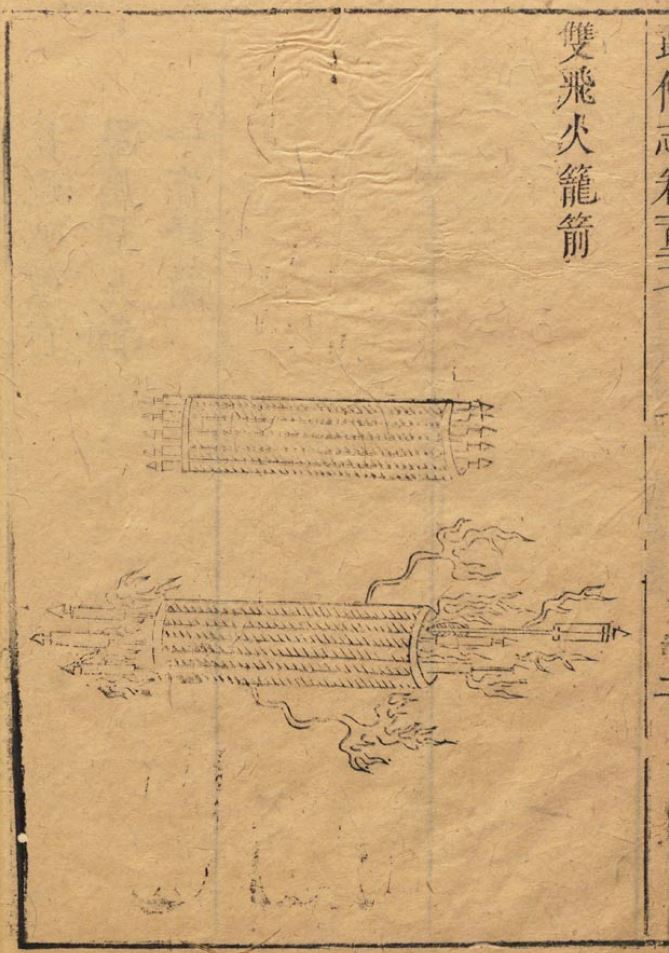

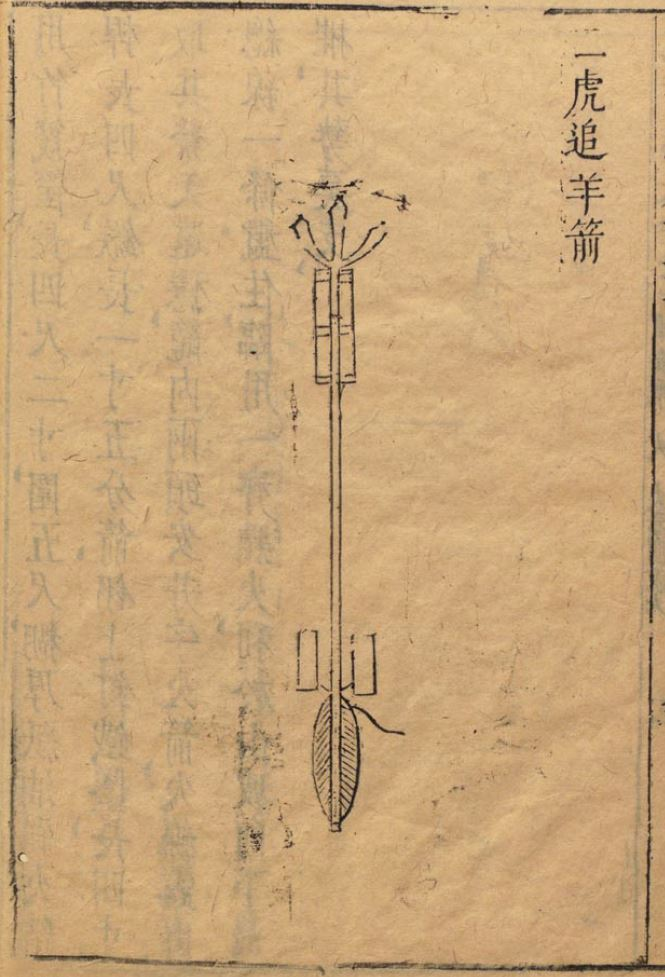

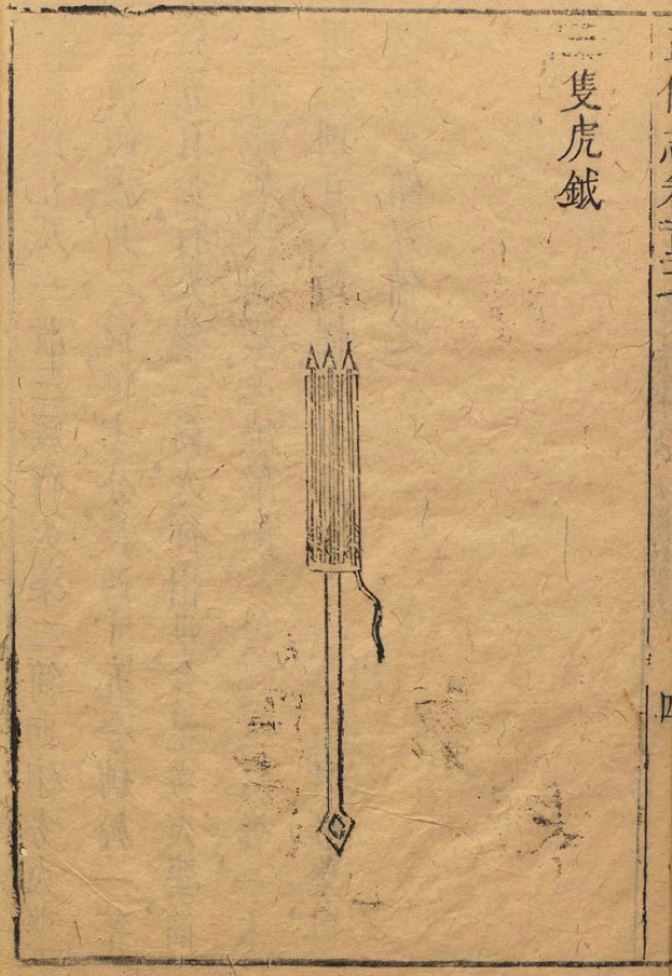

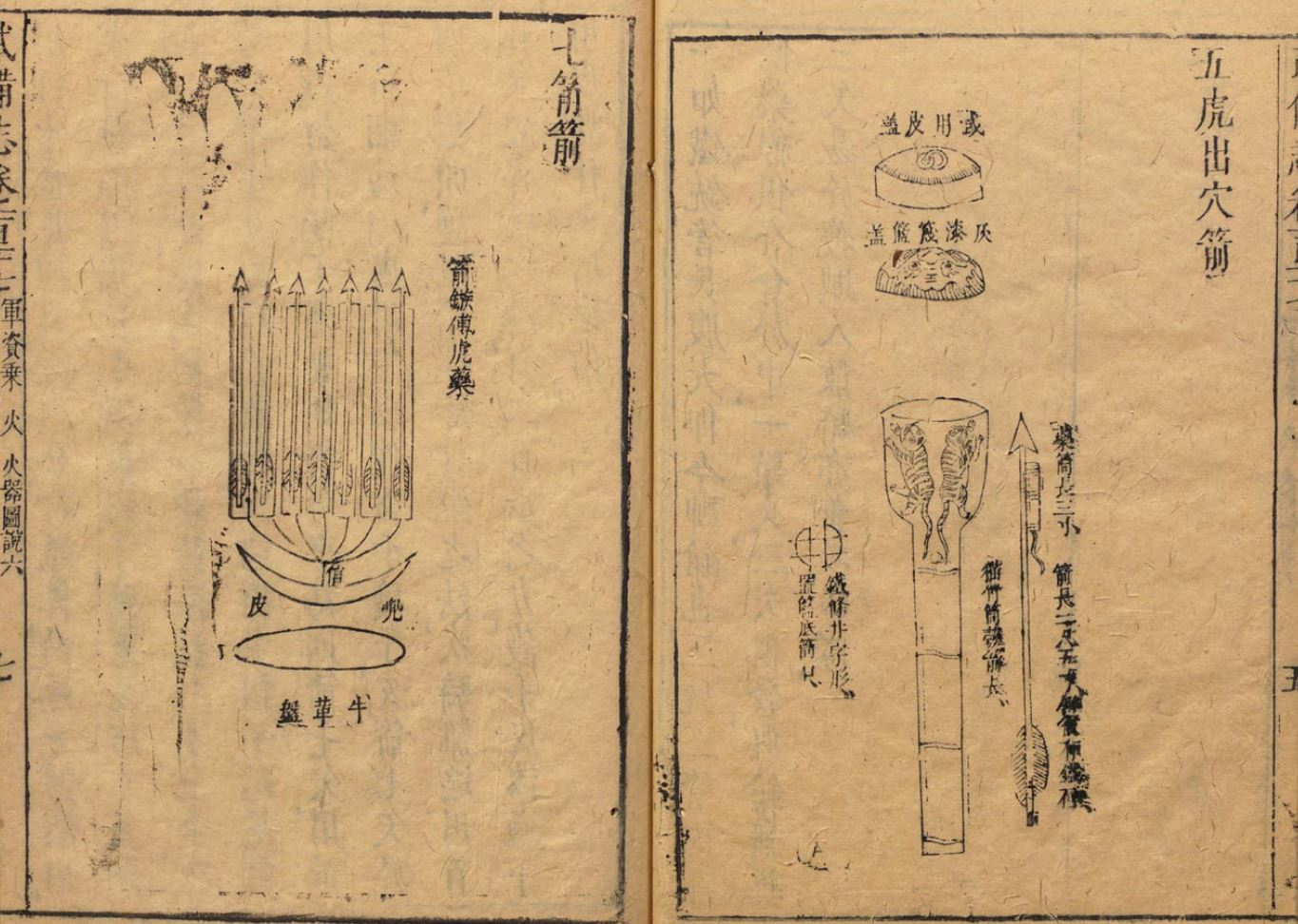

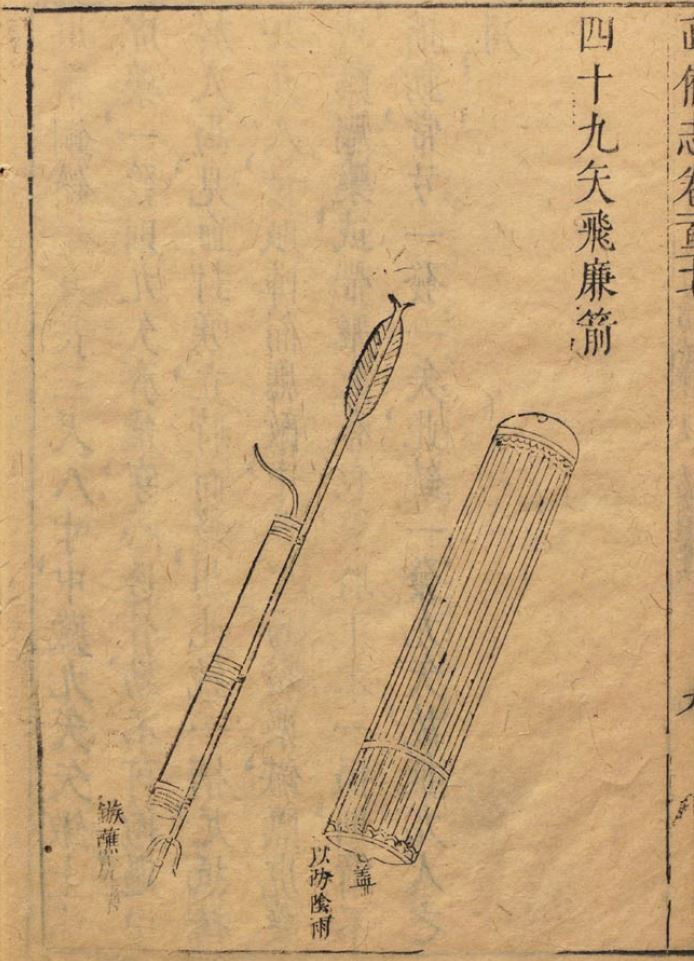

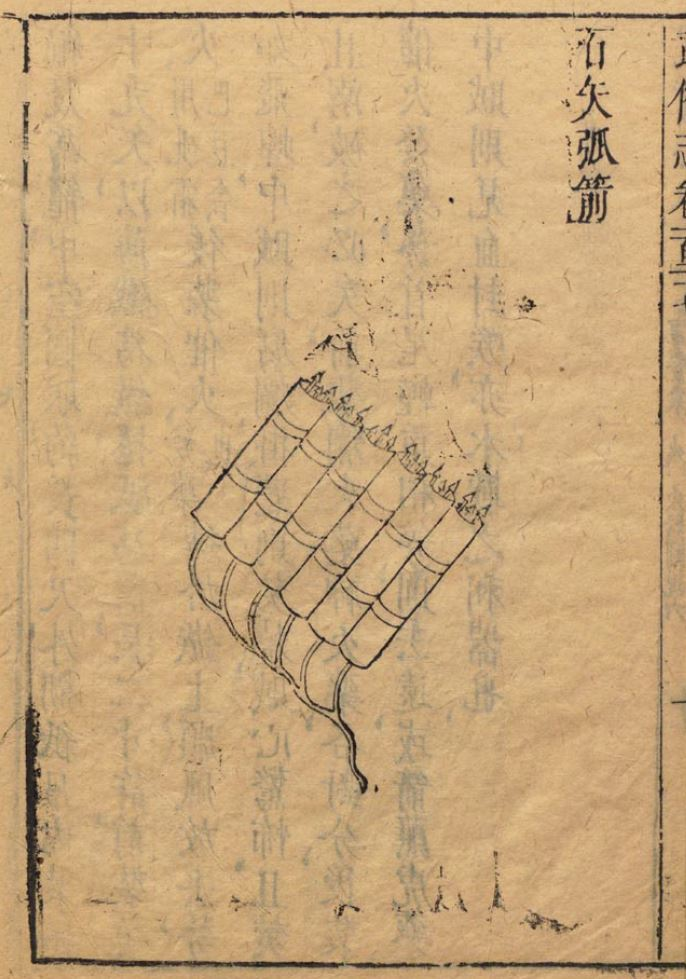

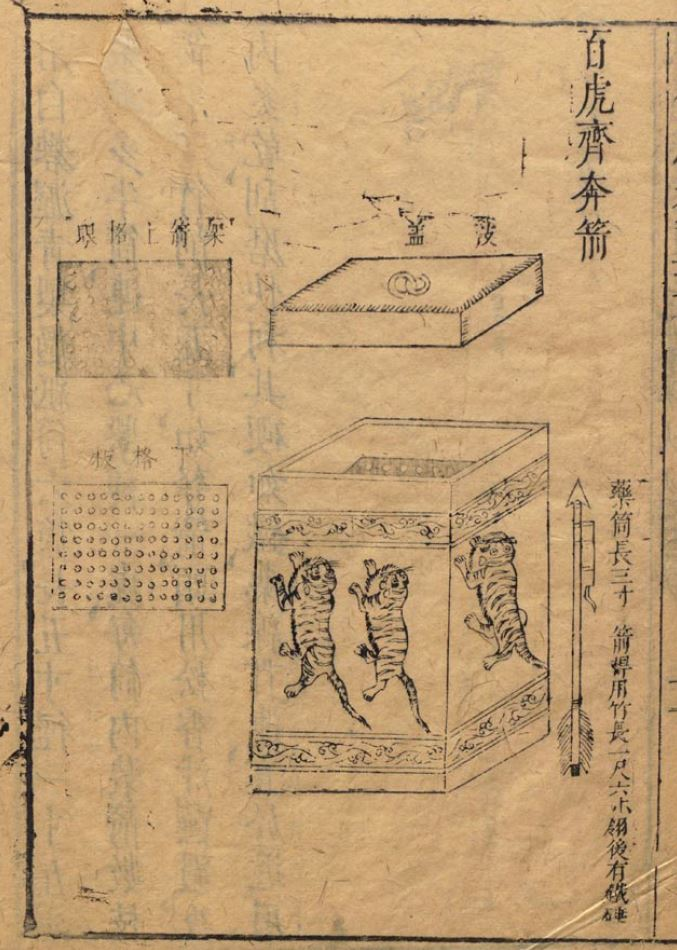

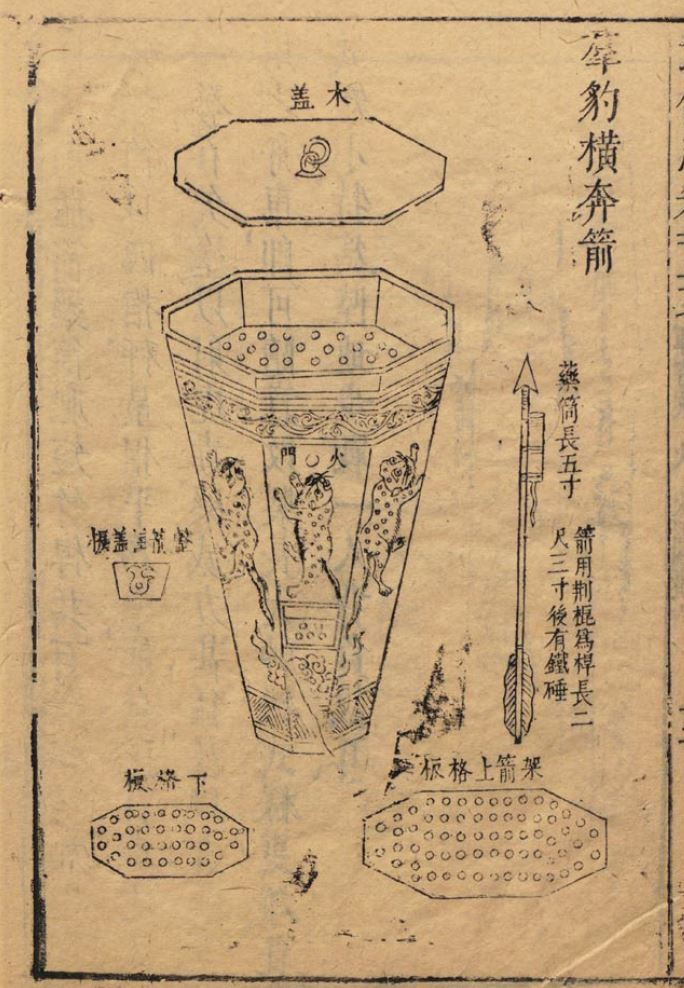

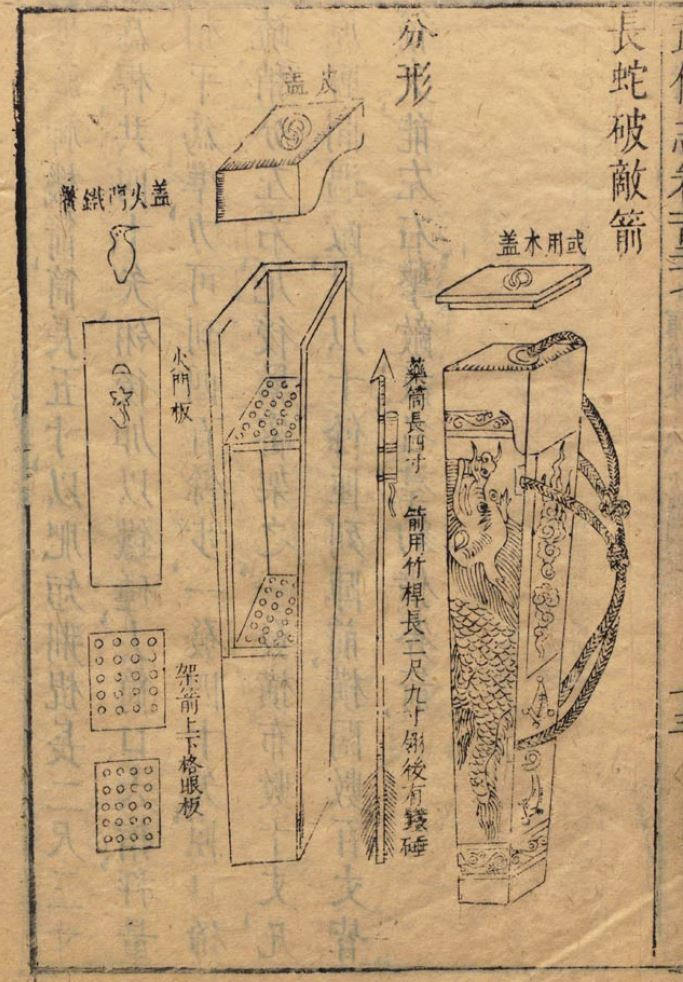

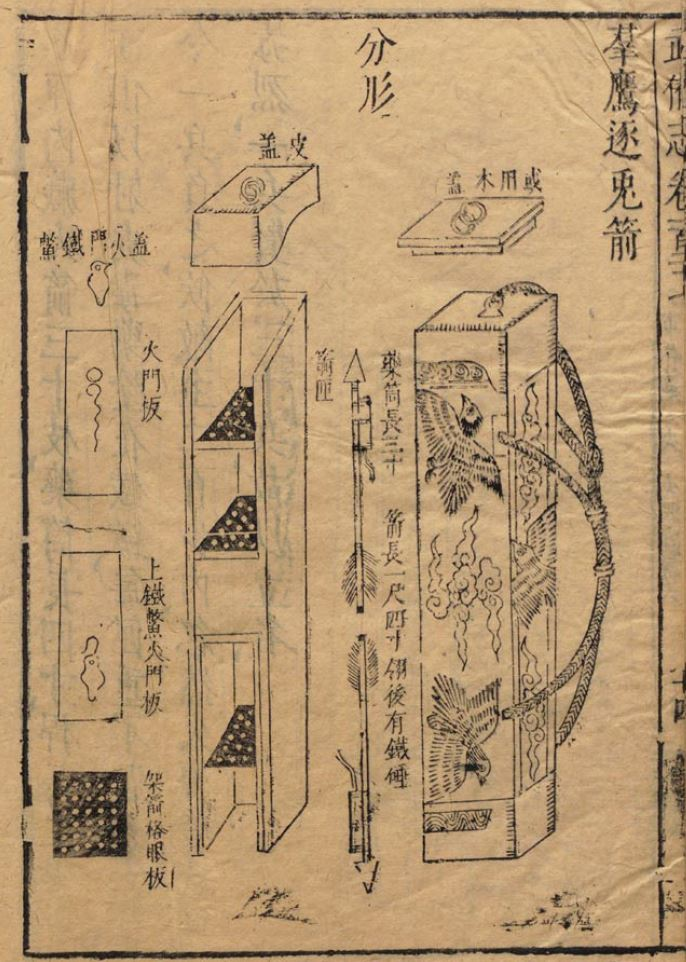

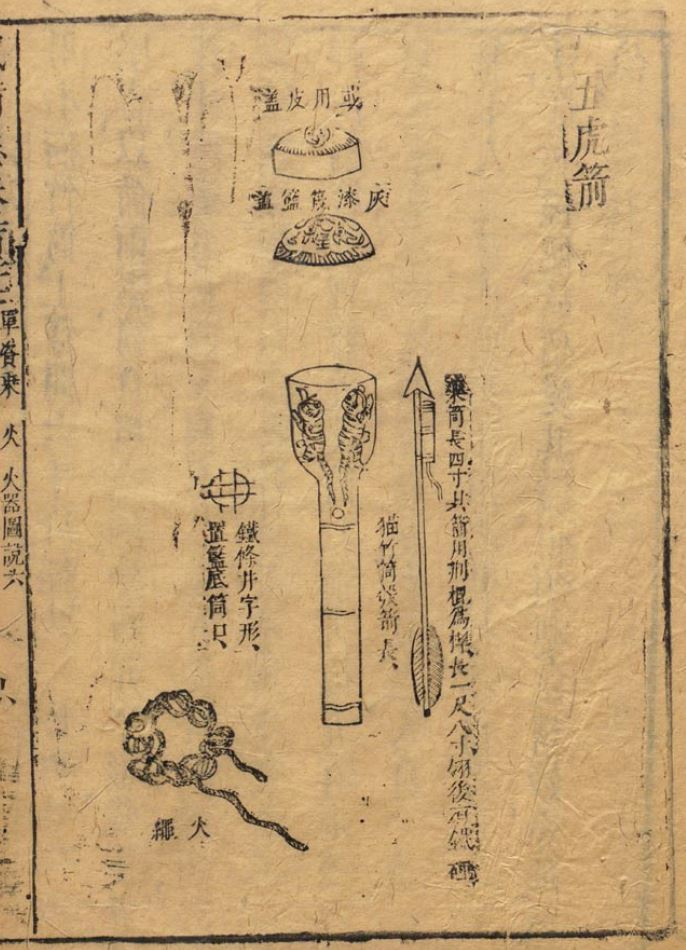

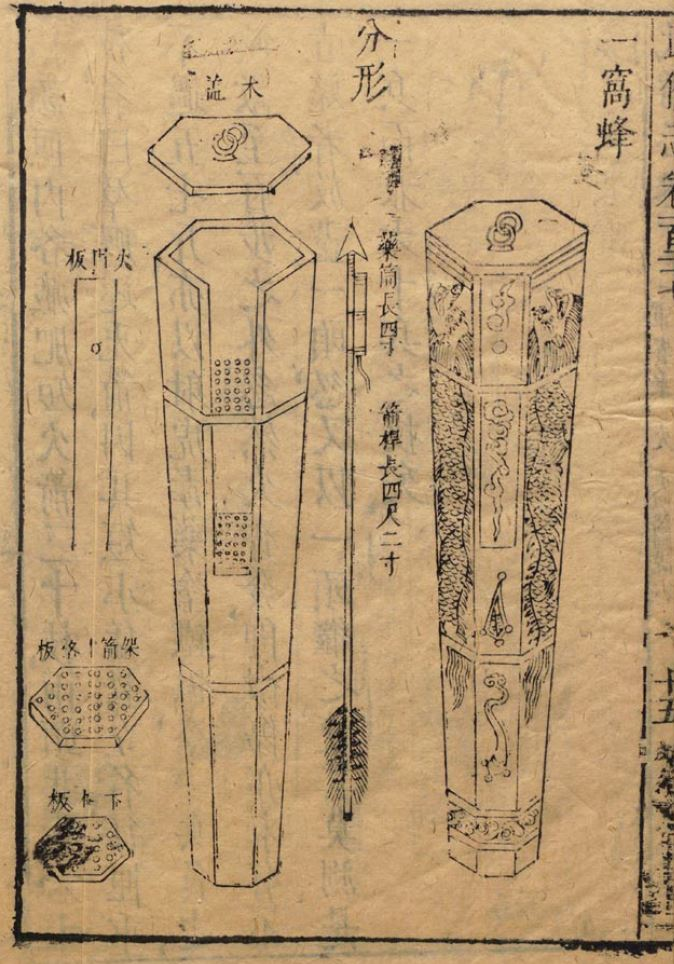

=== Hand cannons and fire lances ===
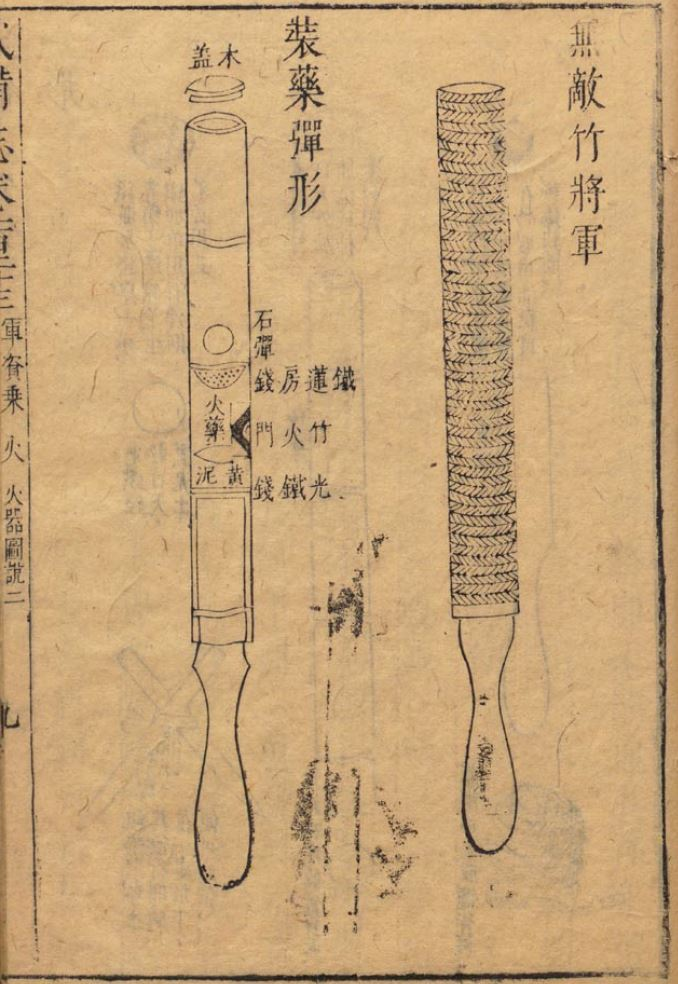

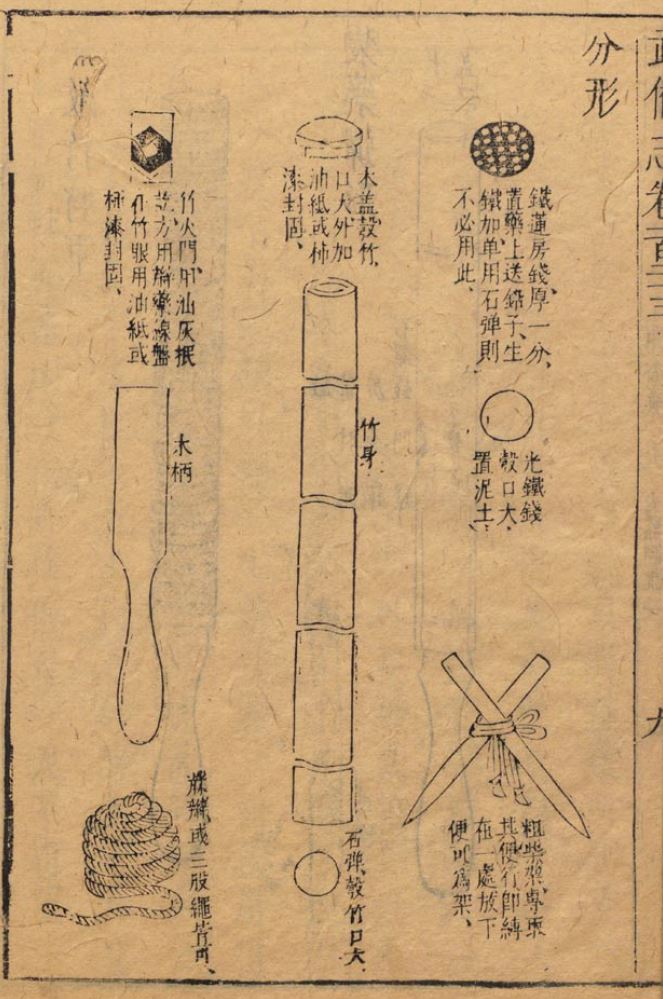

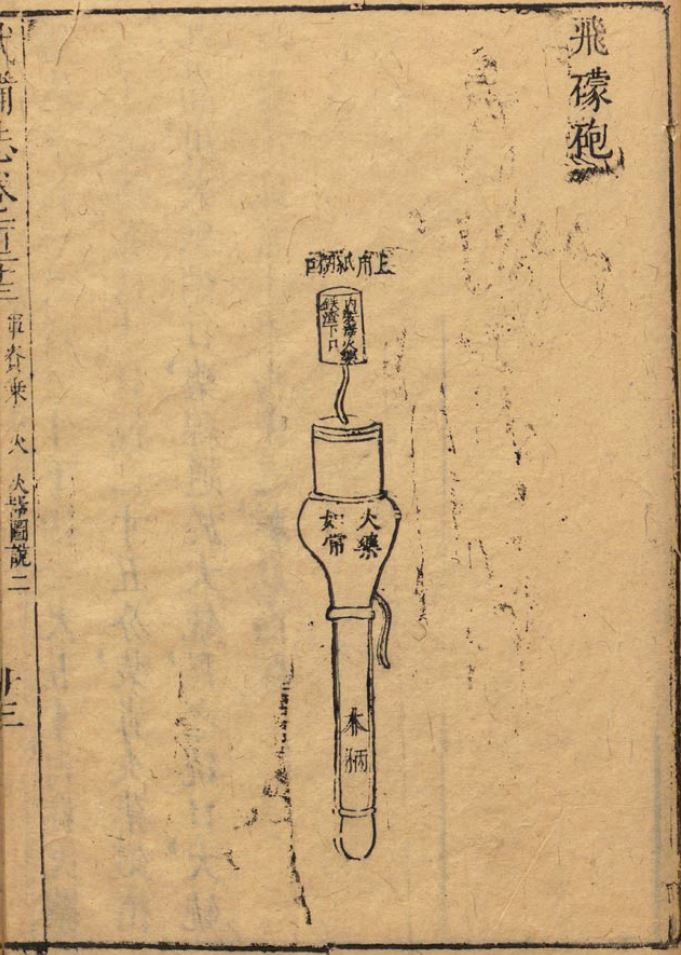

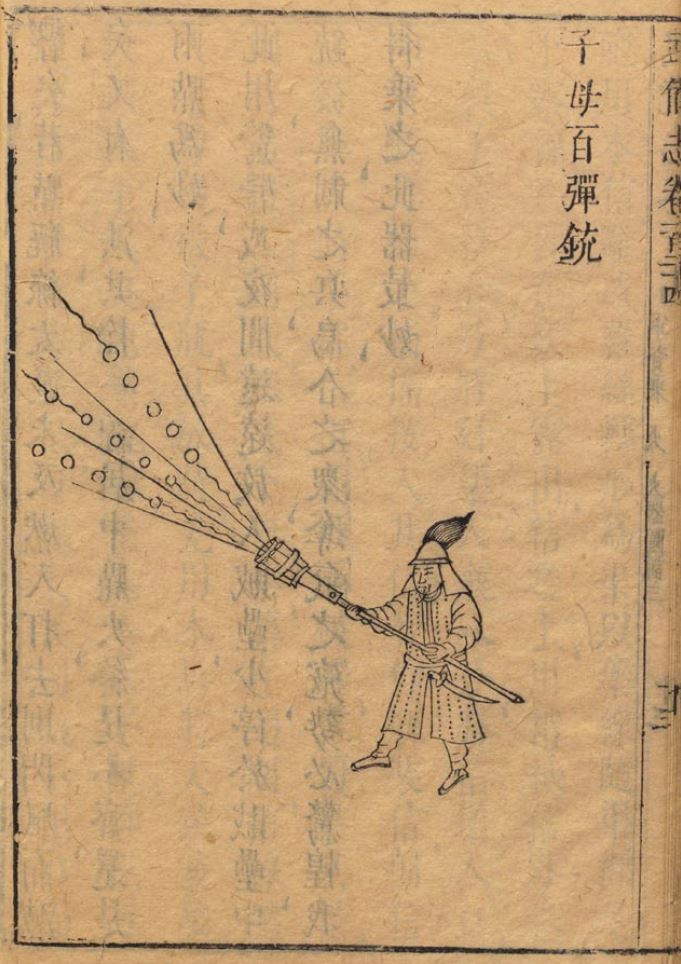

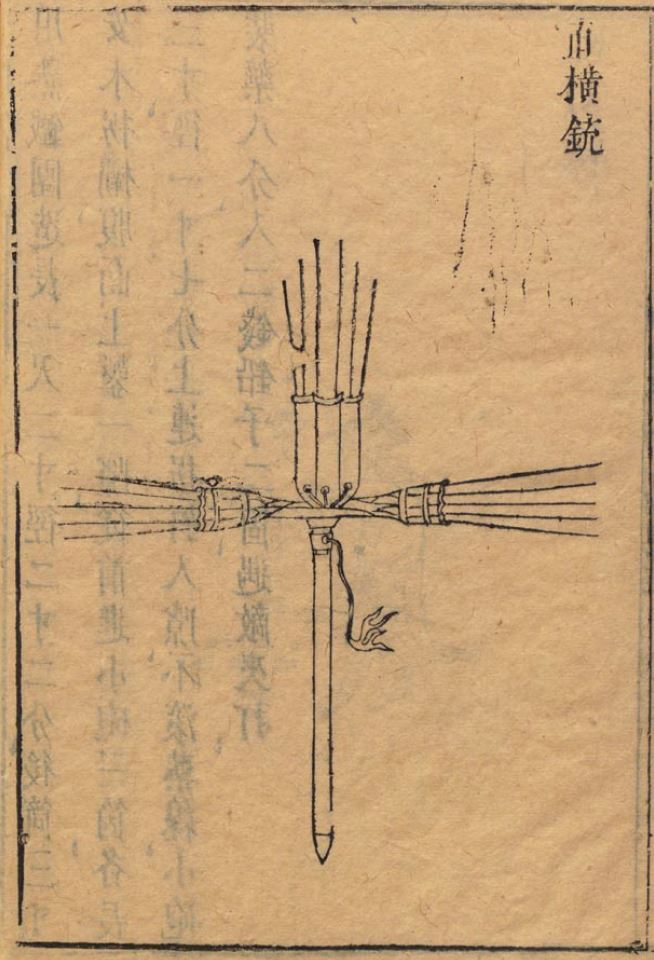

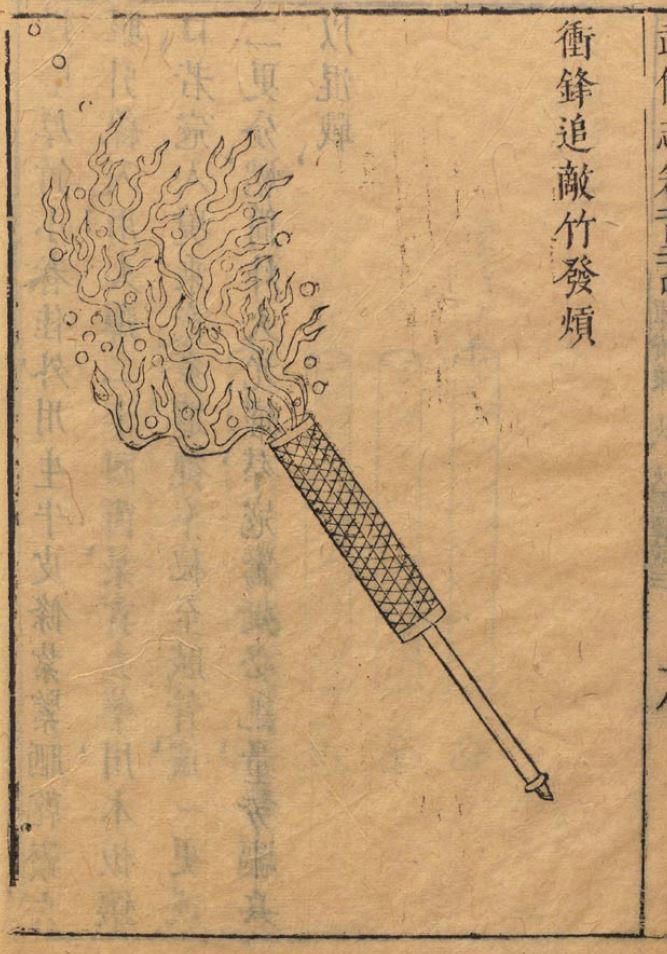

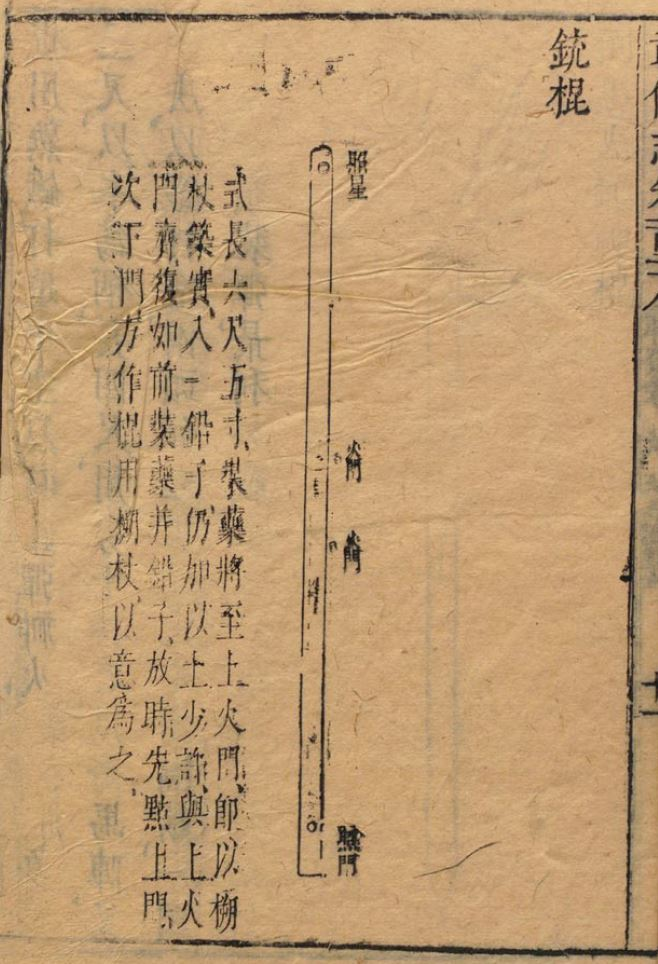

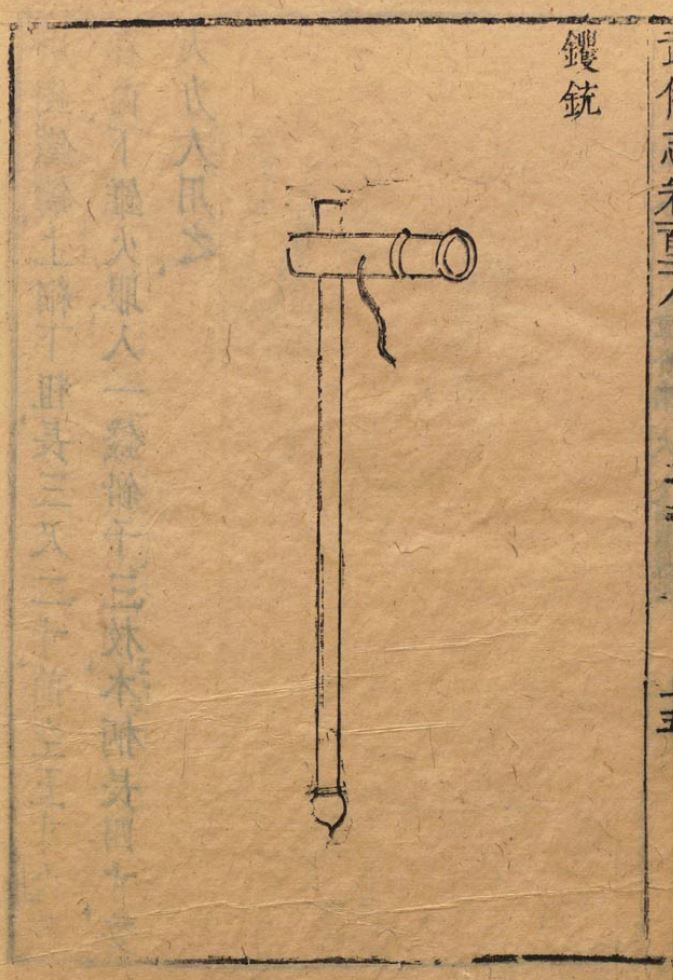

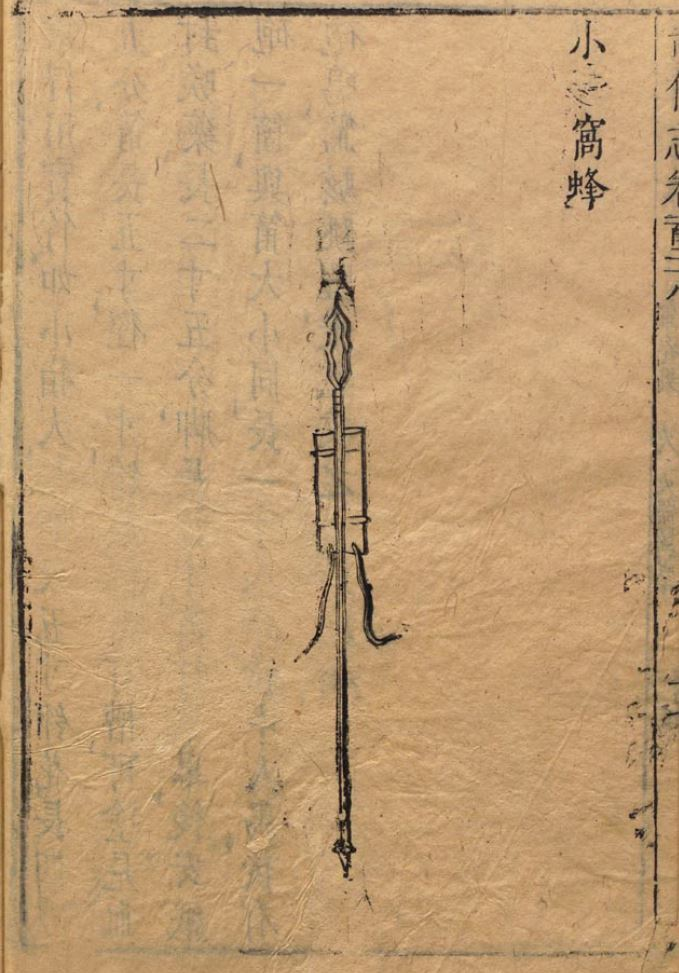

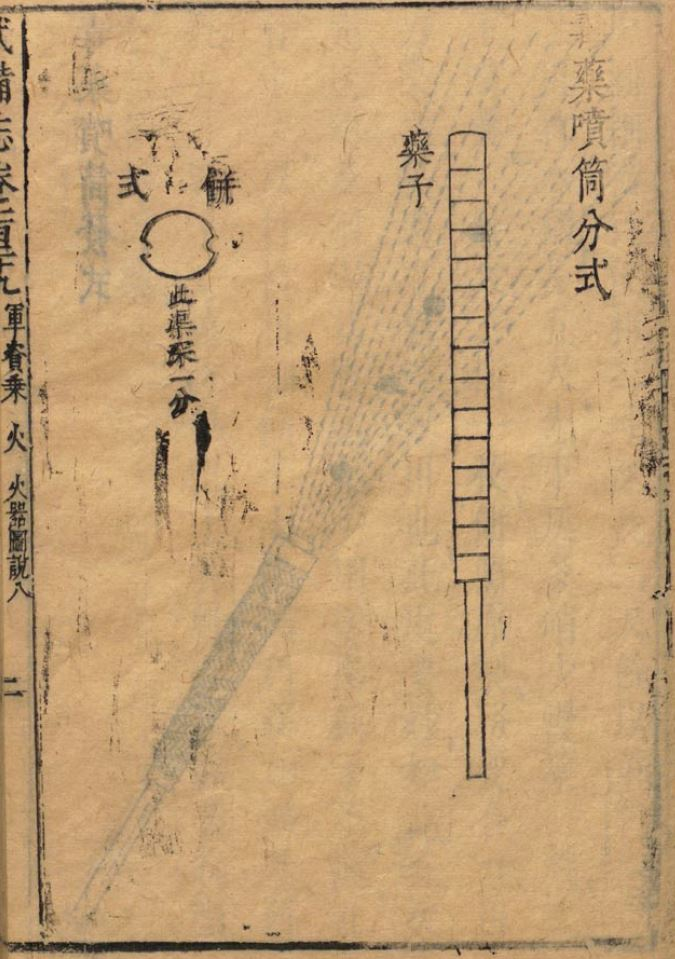

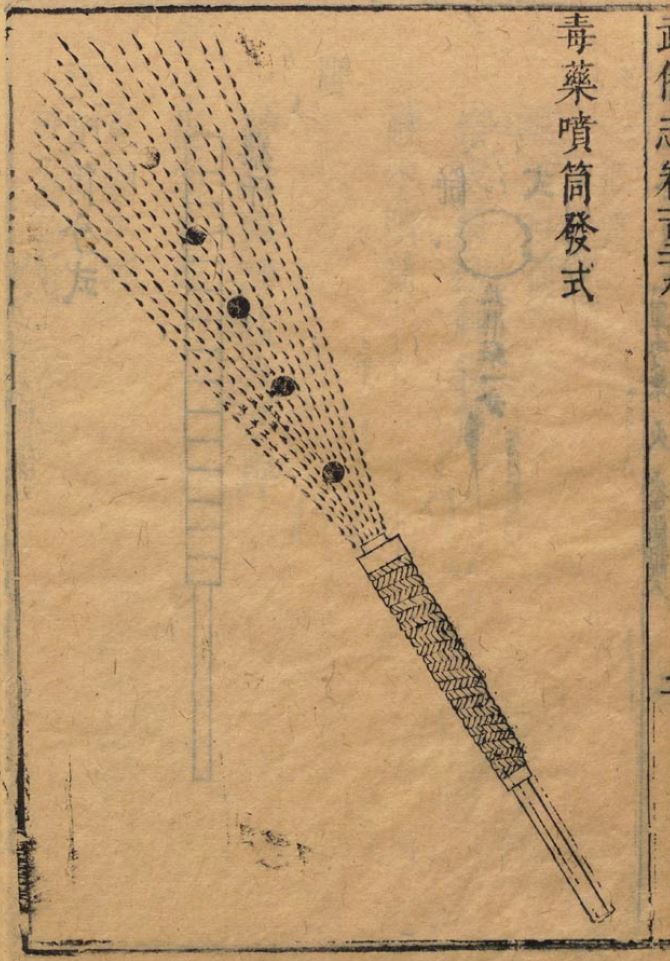

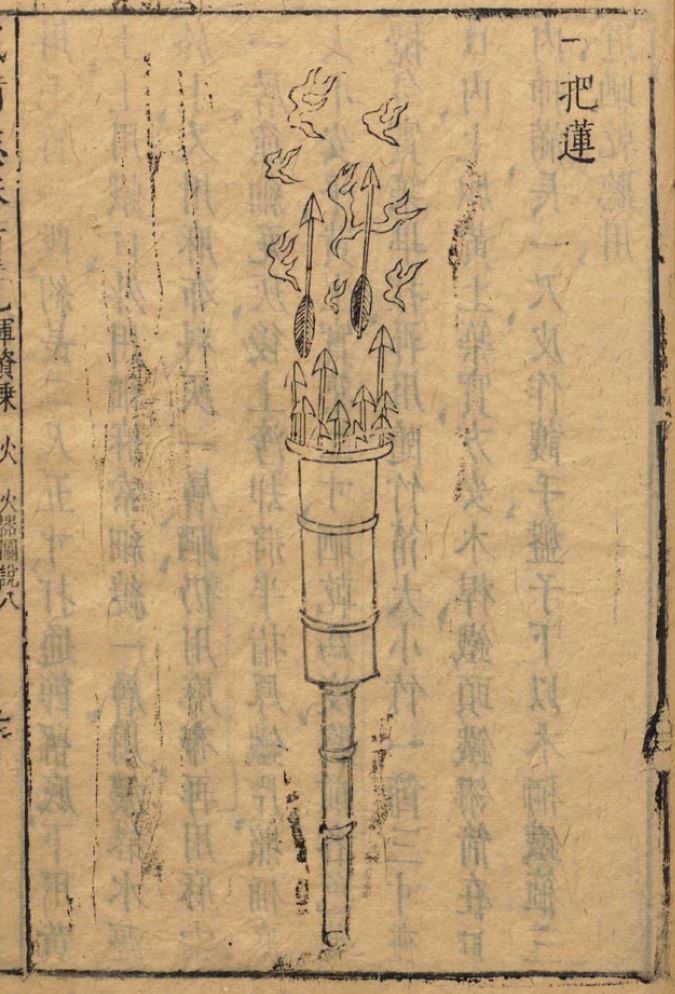

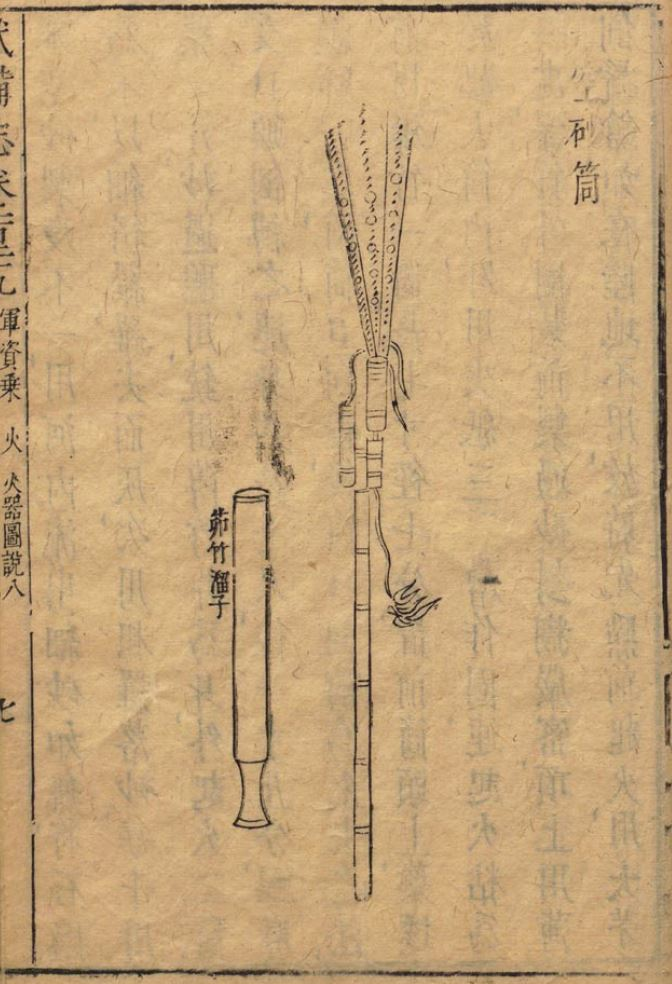

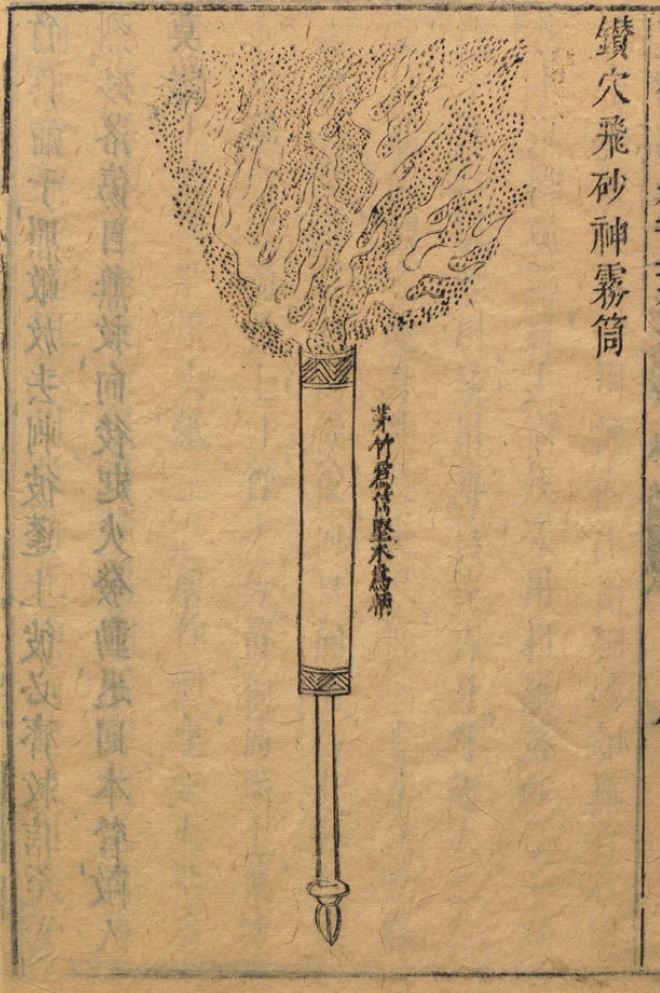

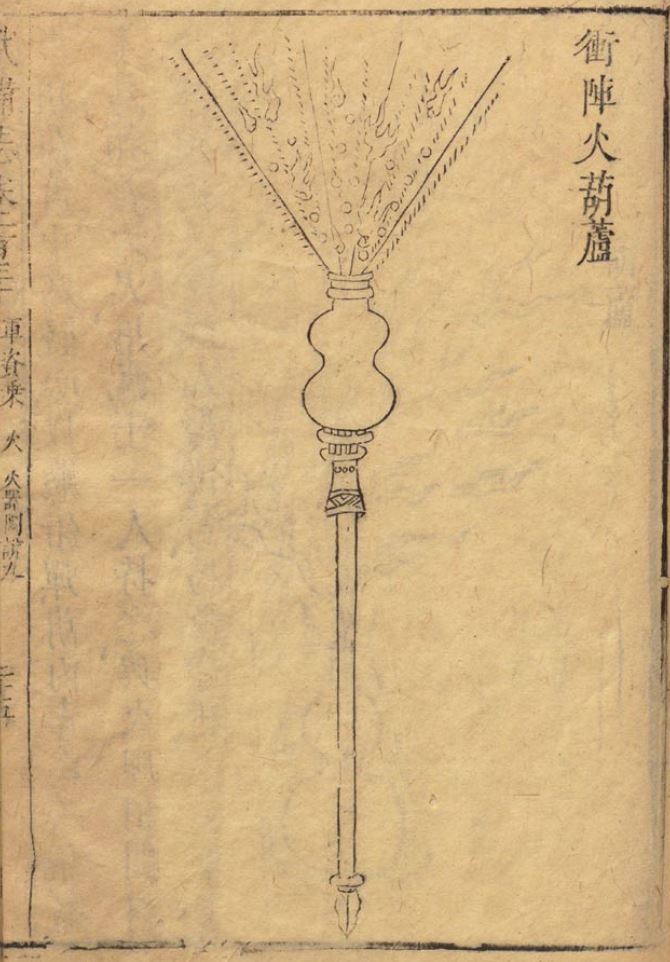

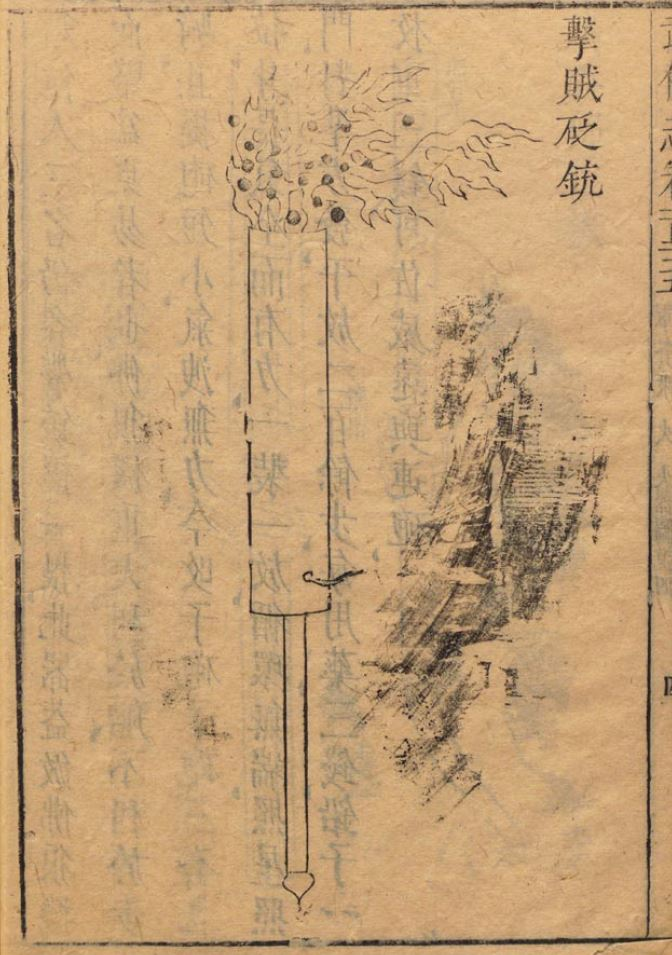

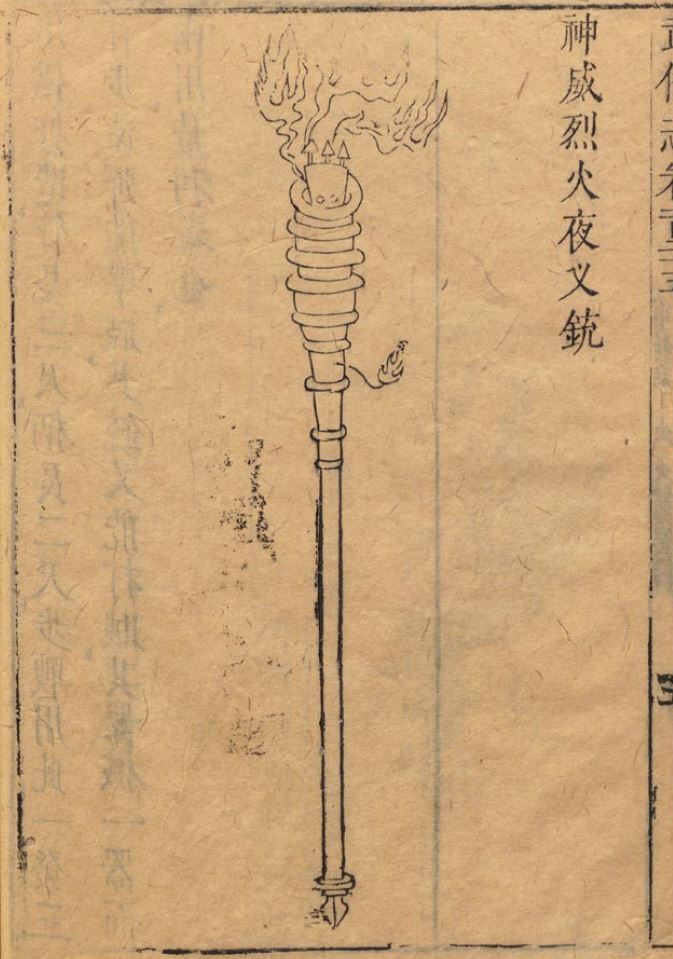

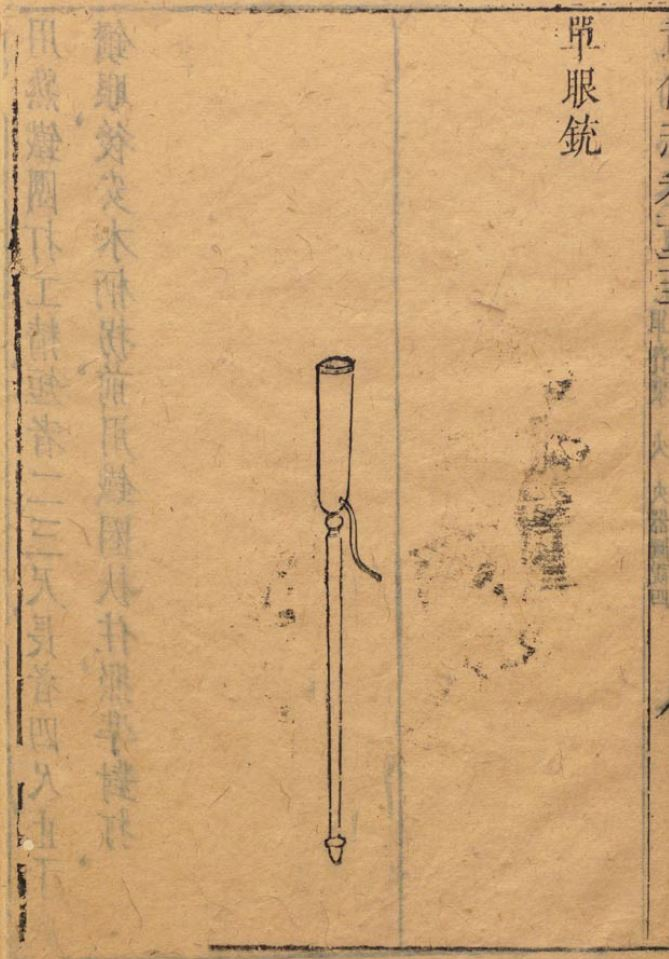

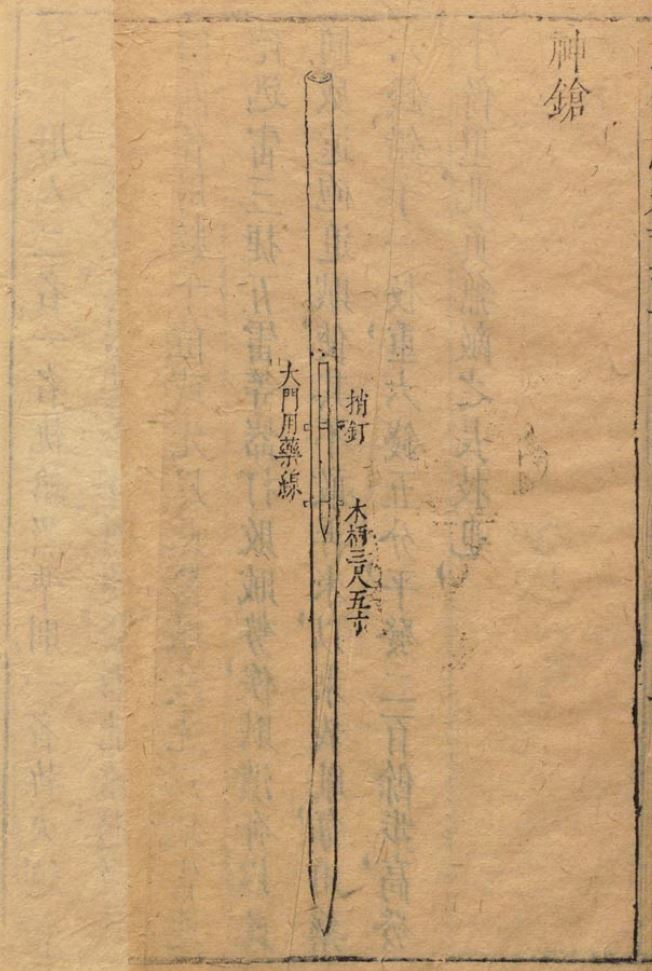

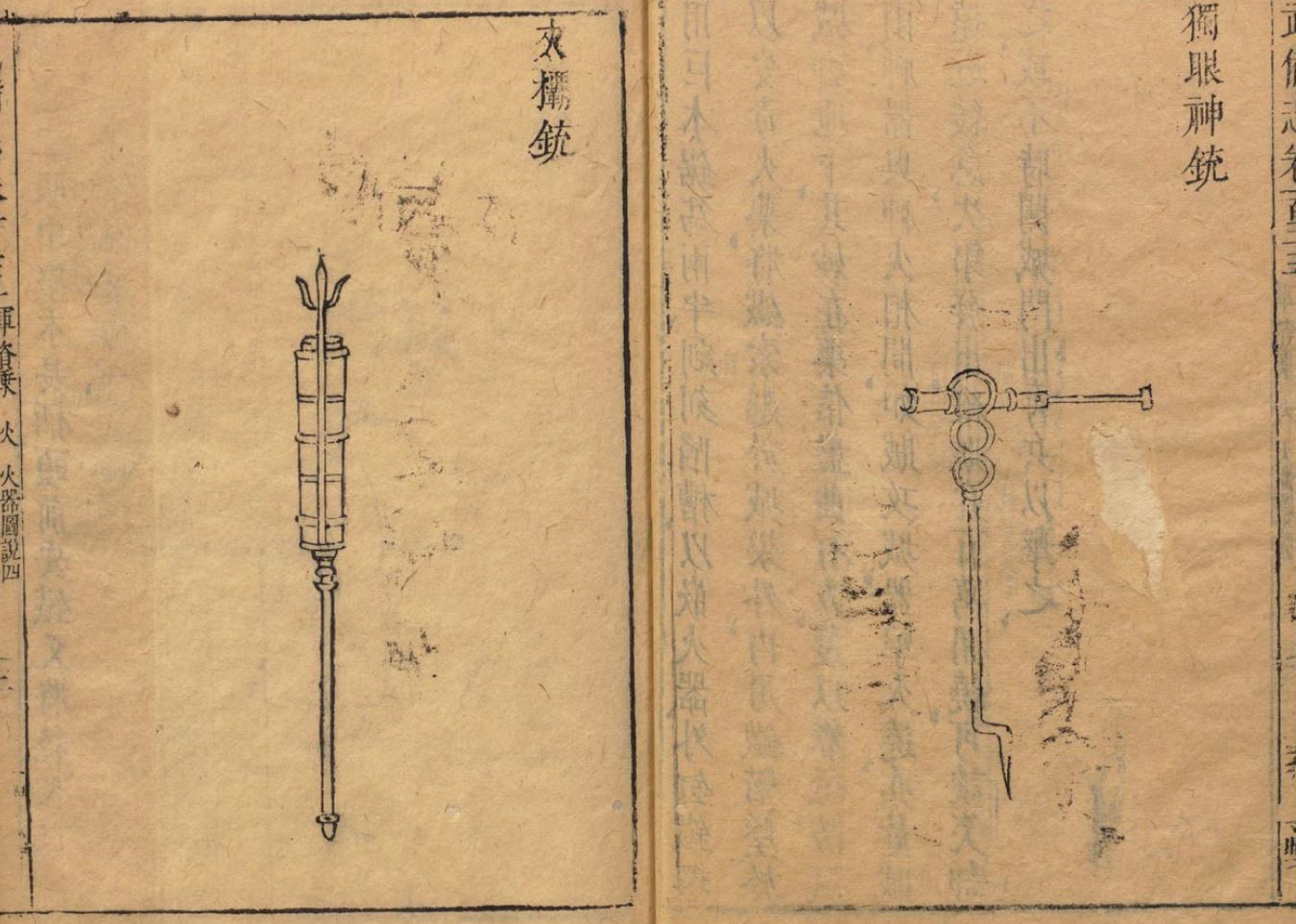

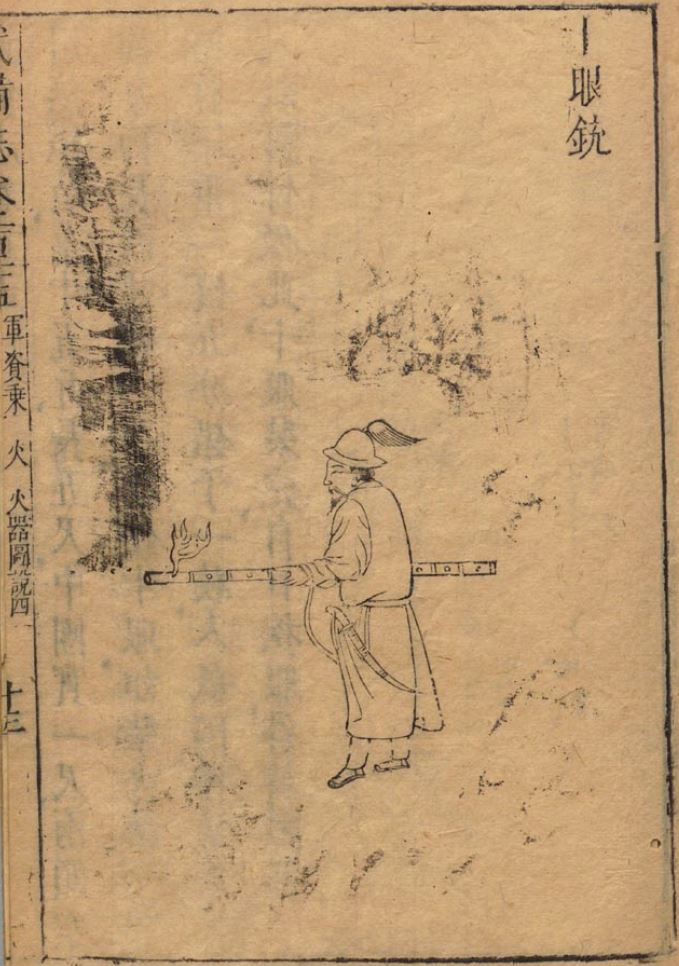

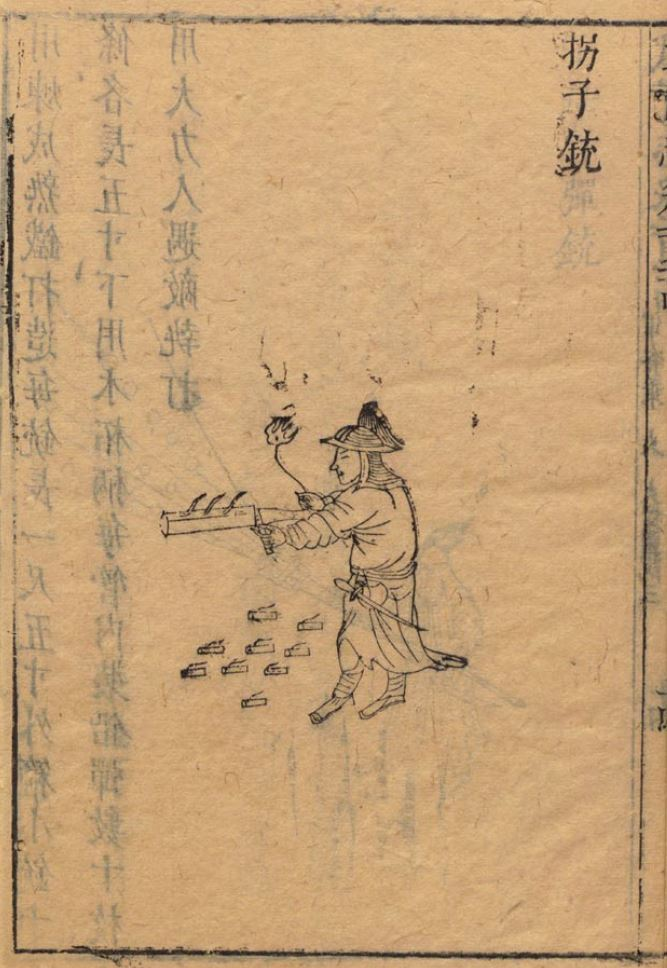

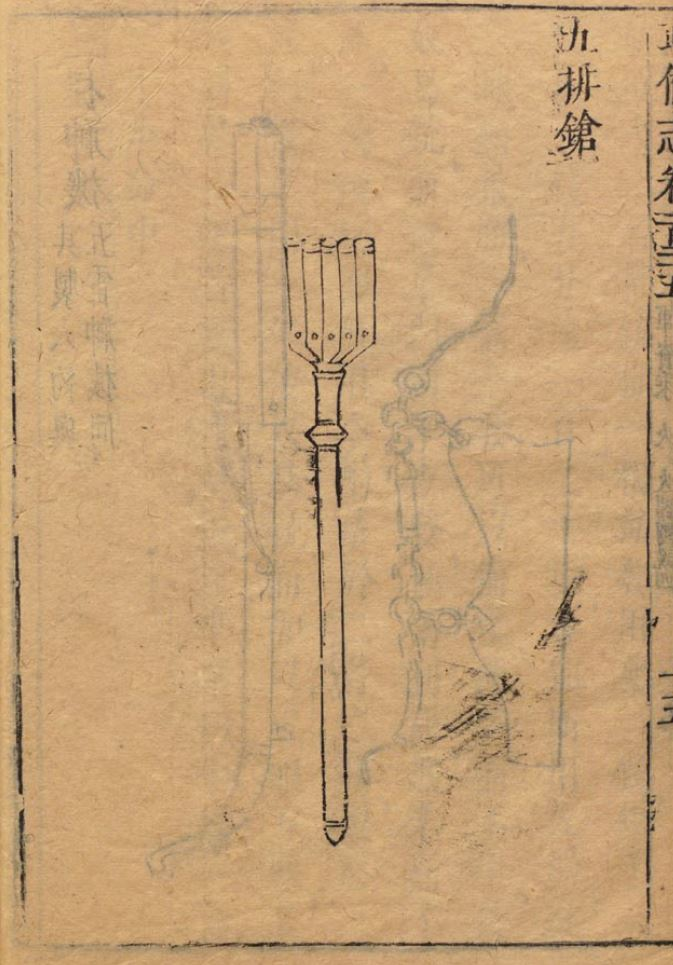

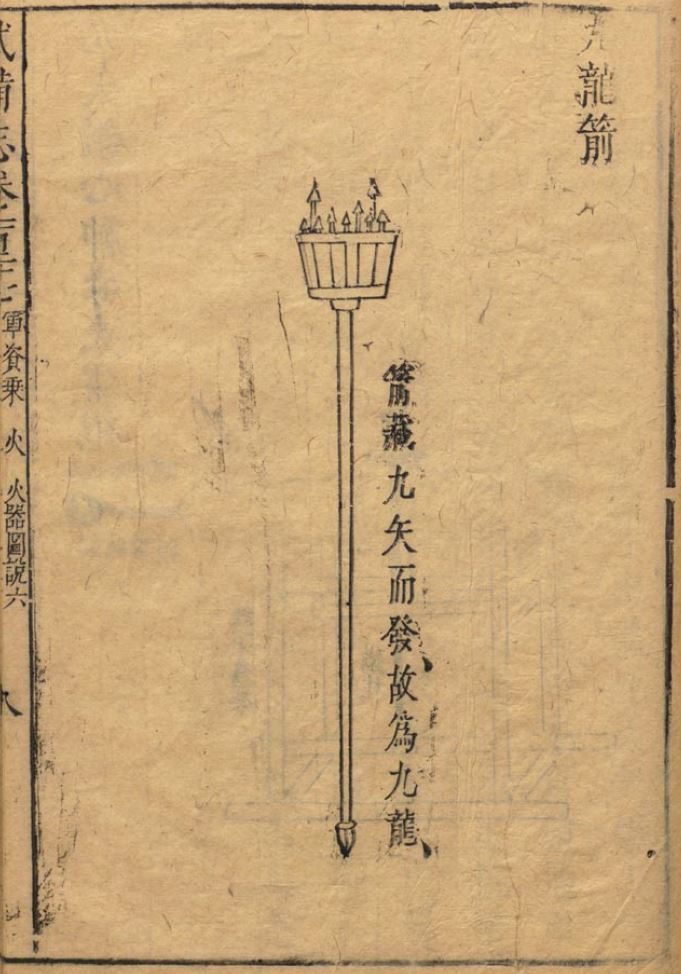

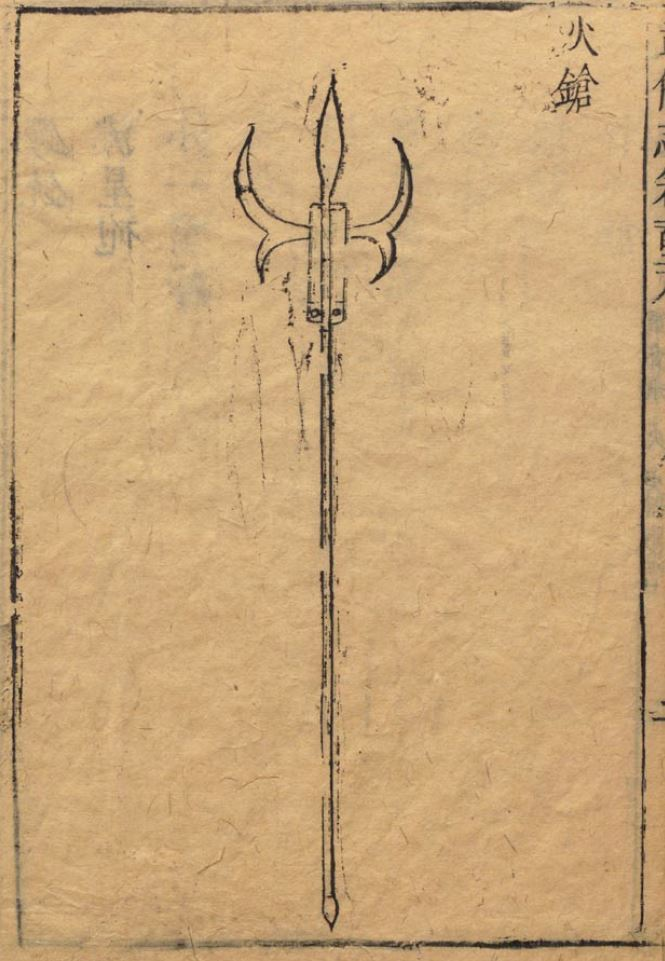

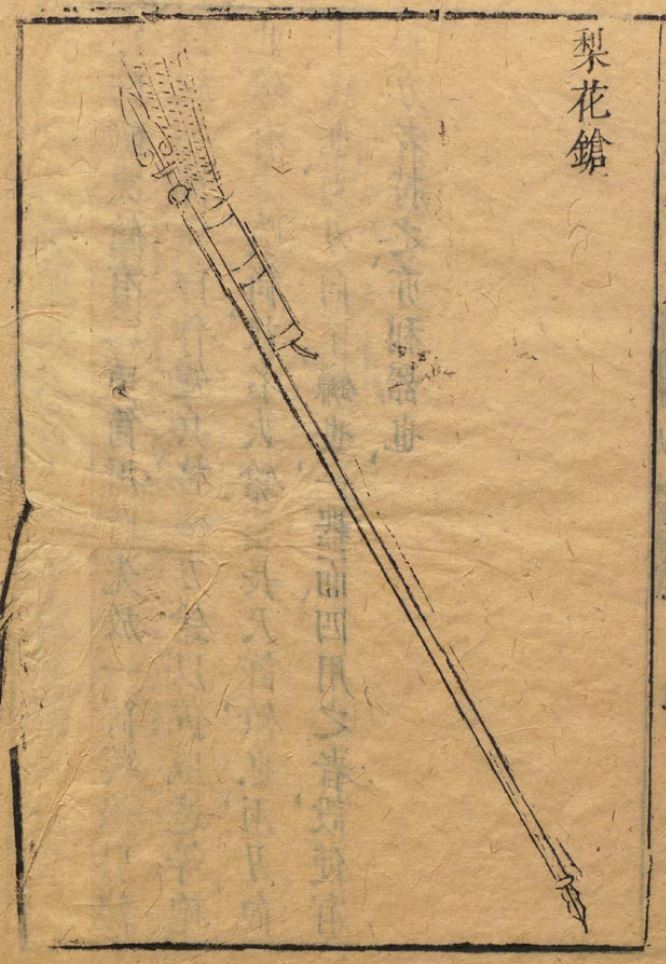

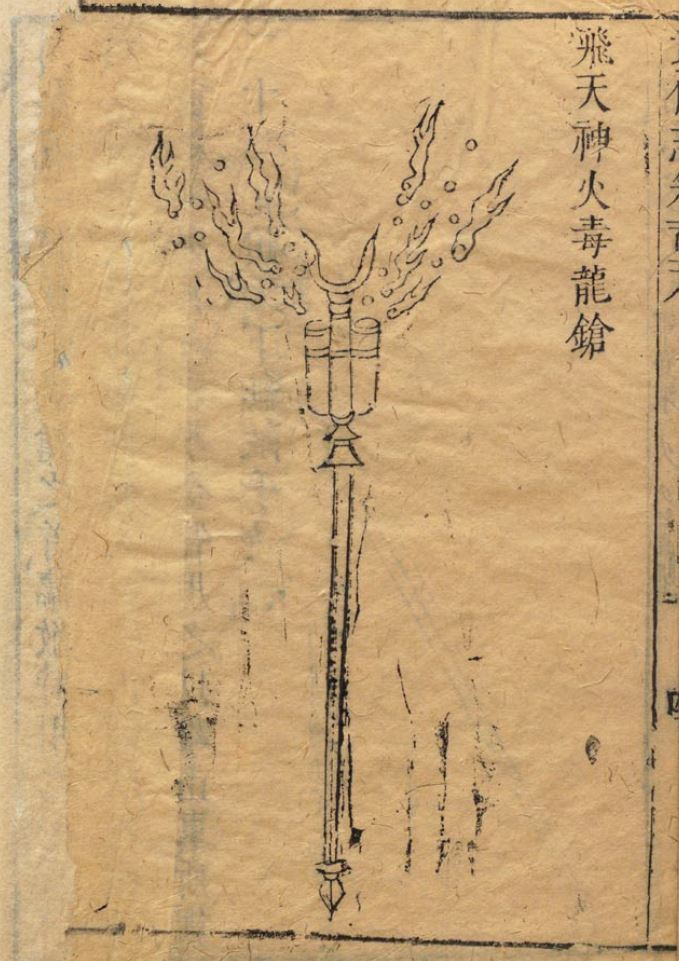

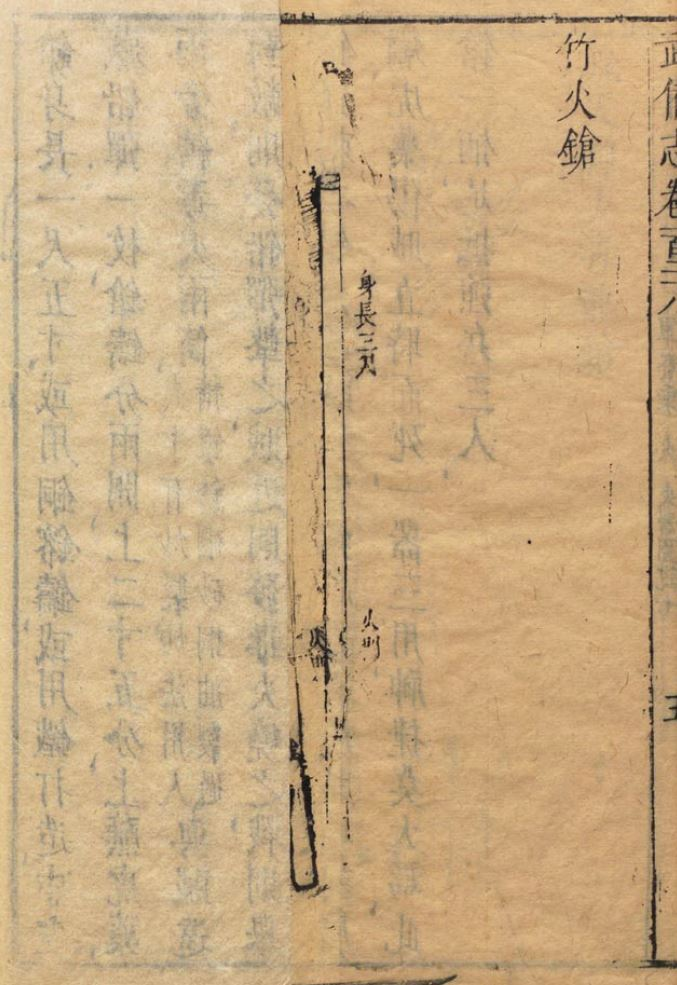

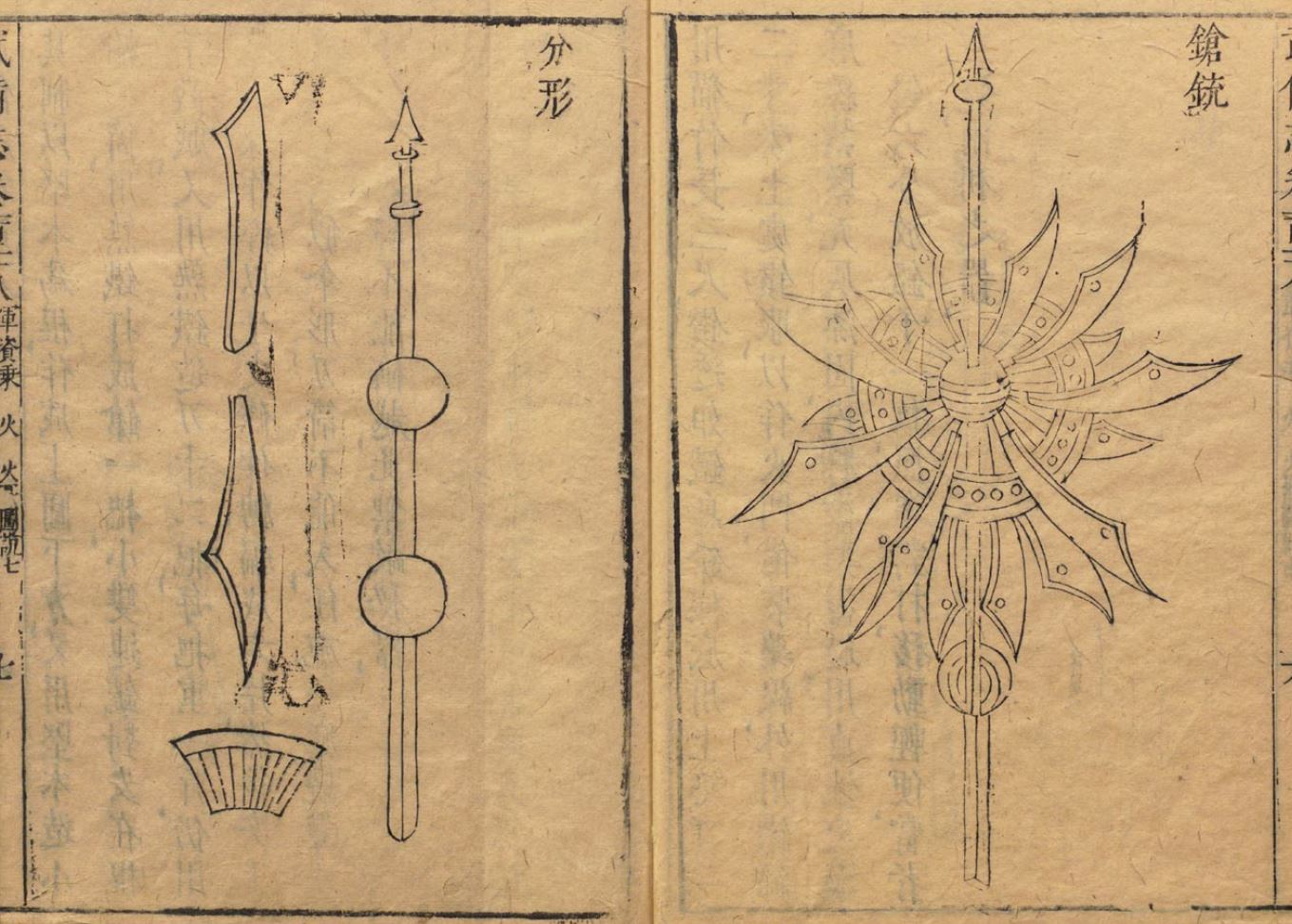

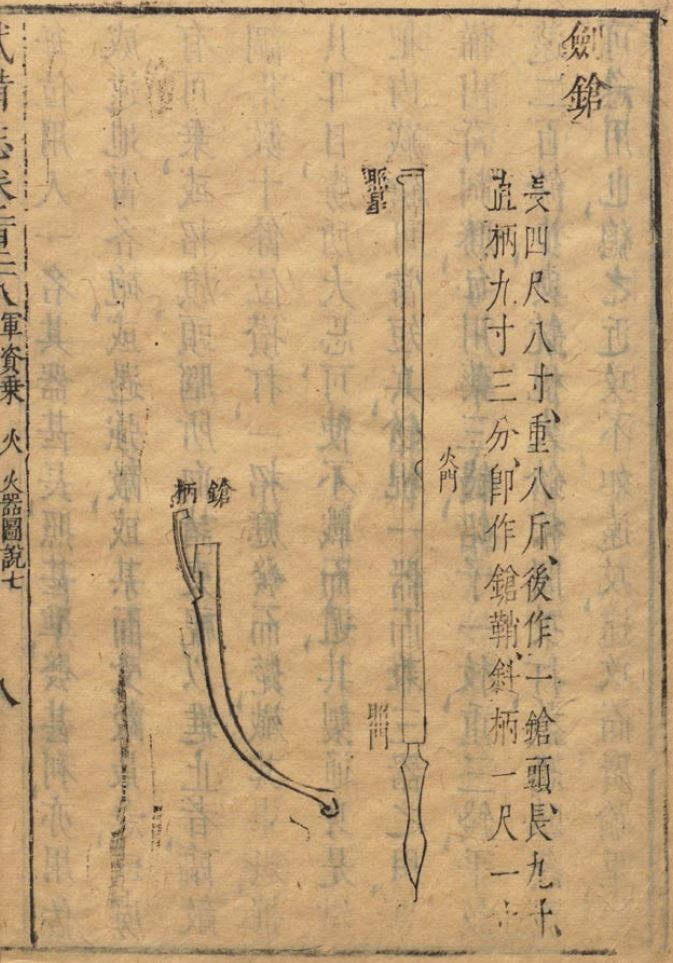

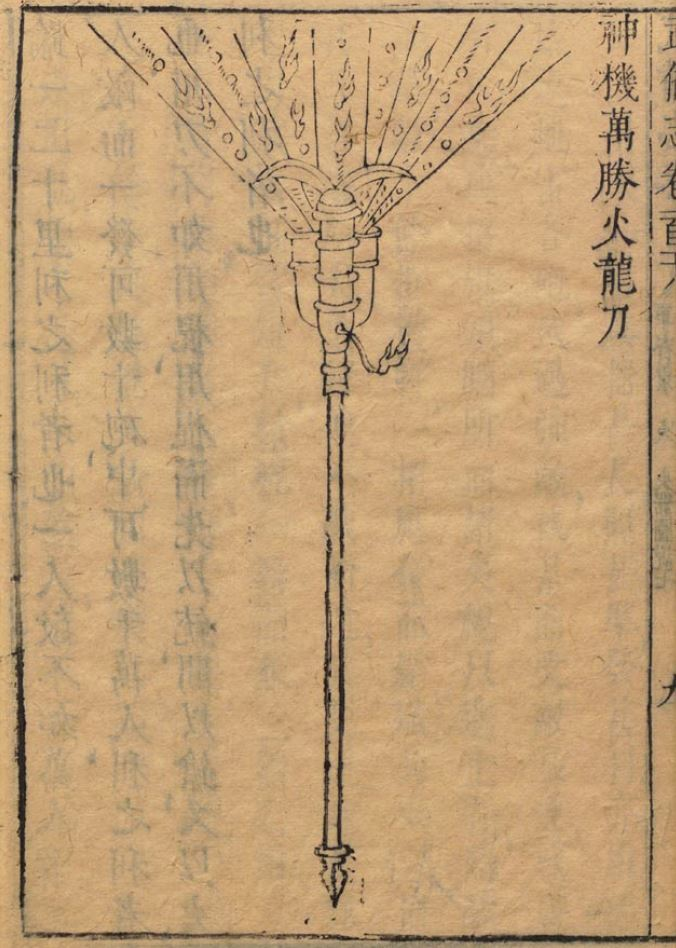

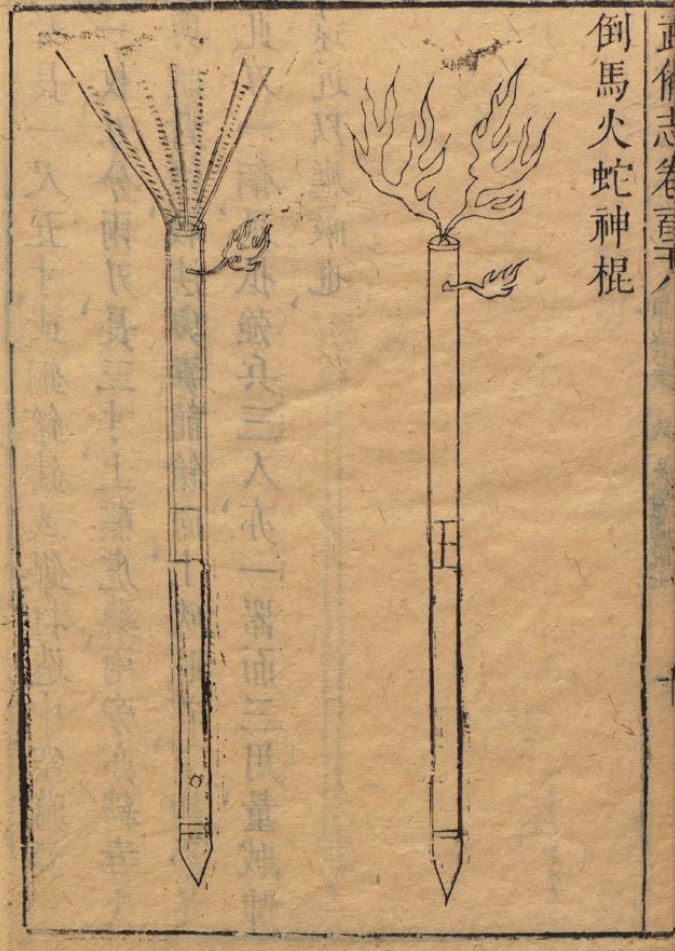

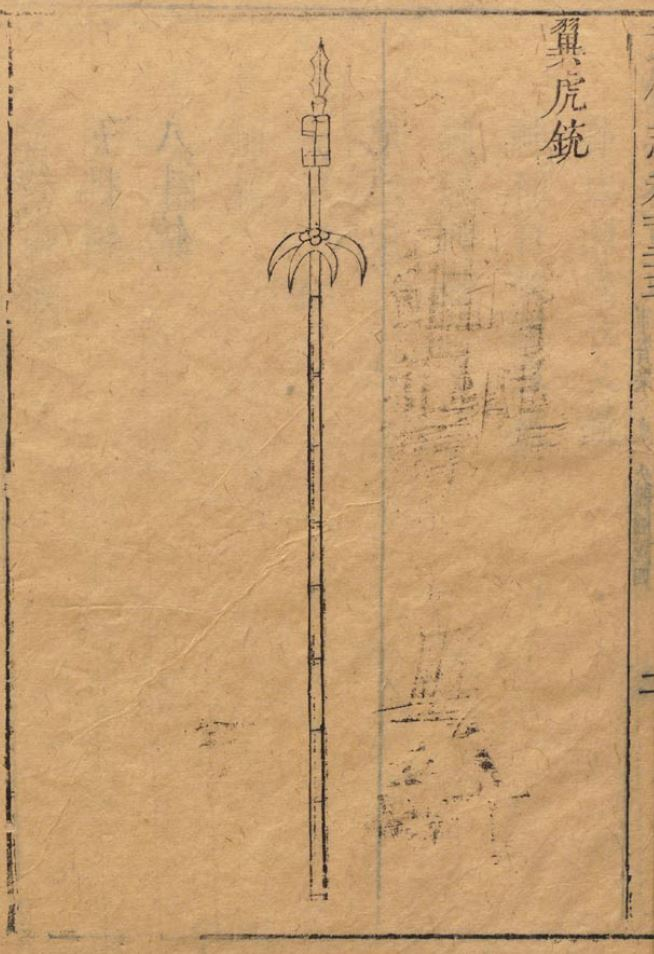

=== Matchlock firearms ===
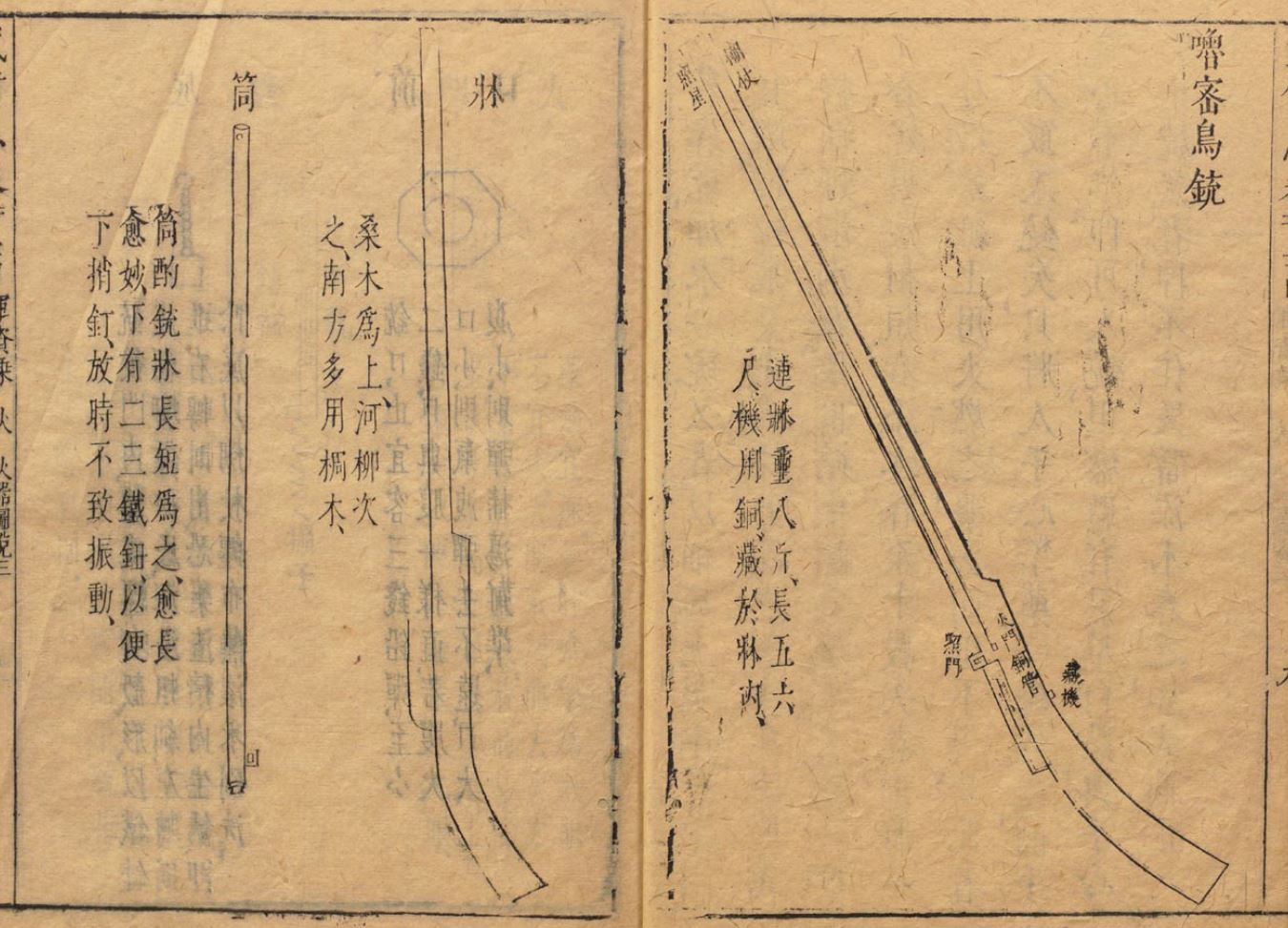

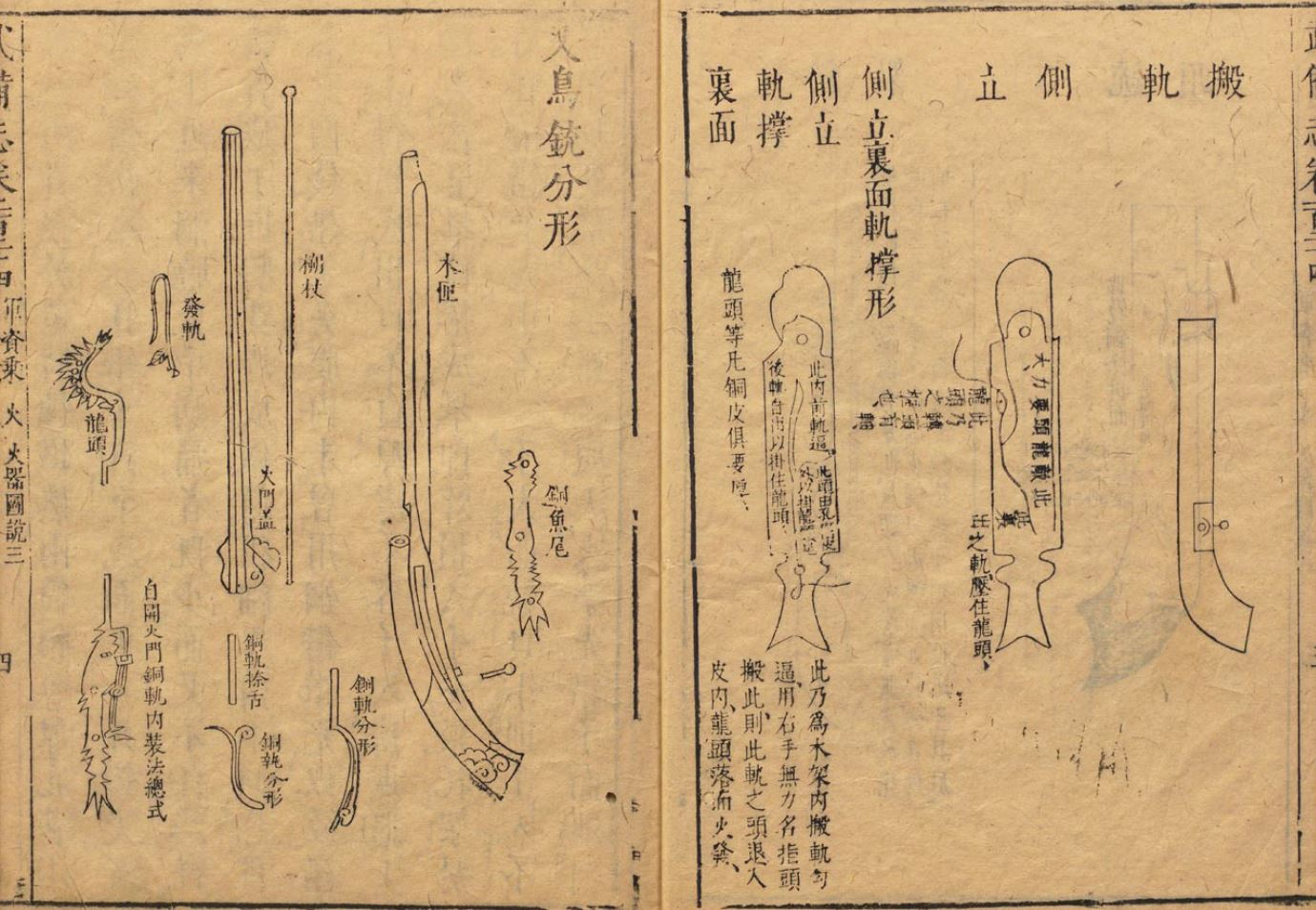

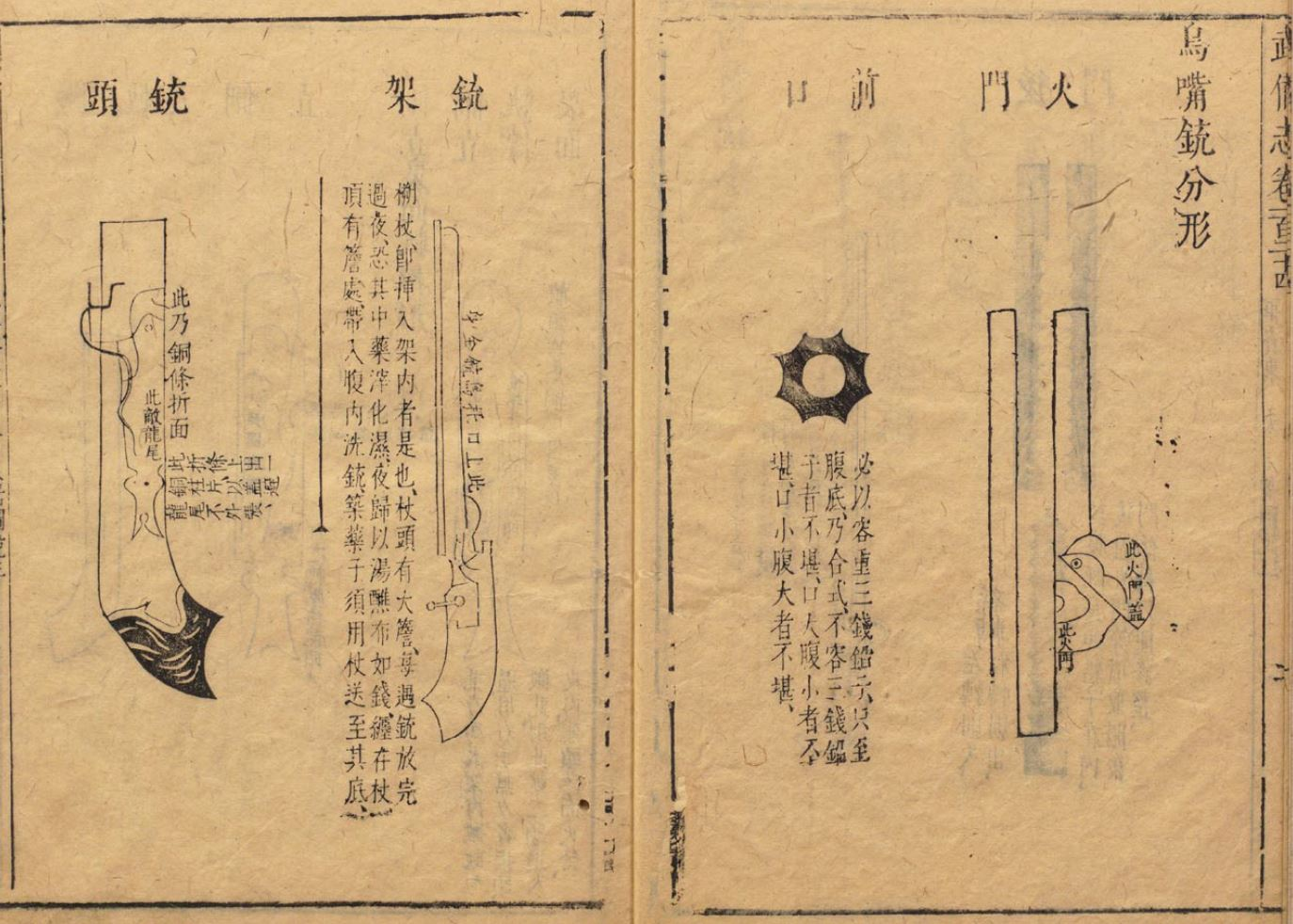

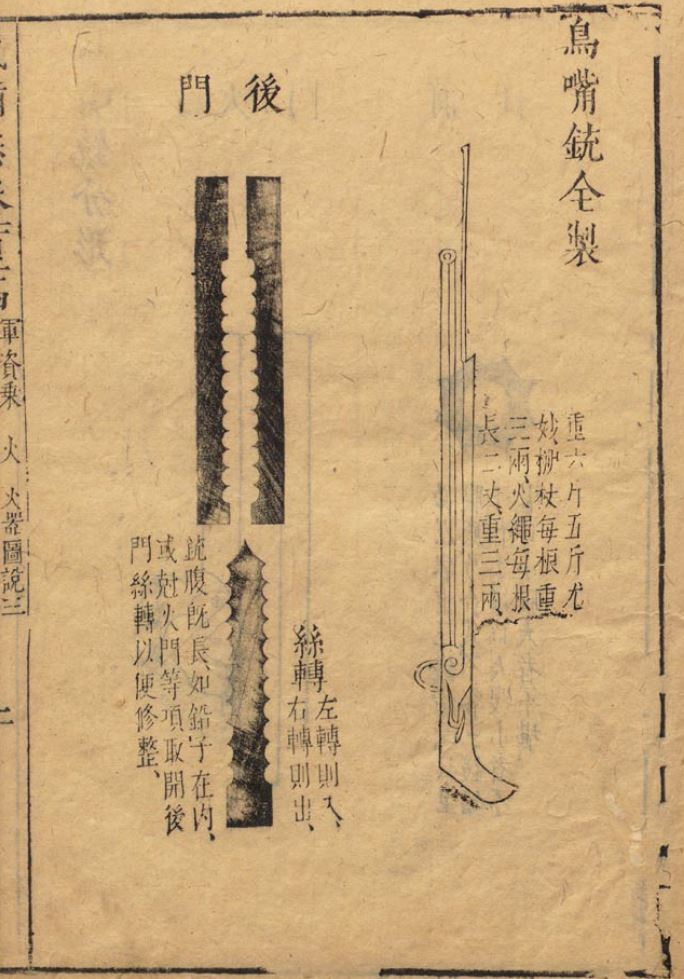

=== Cannons ===
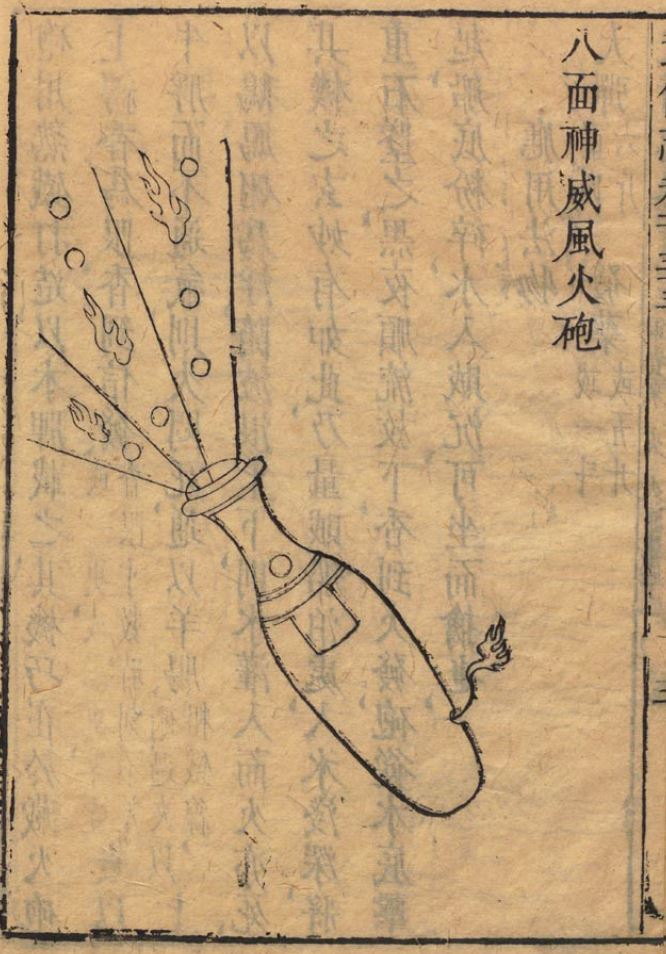

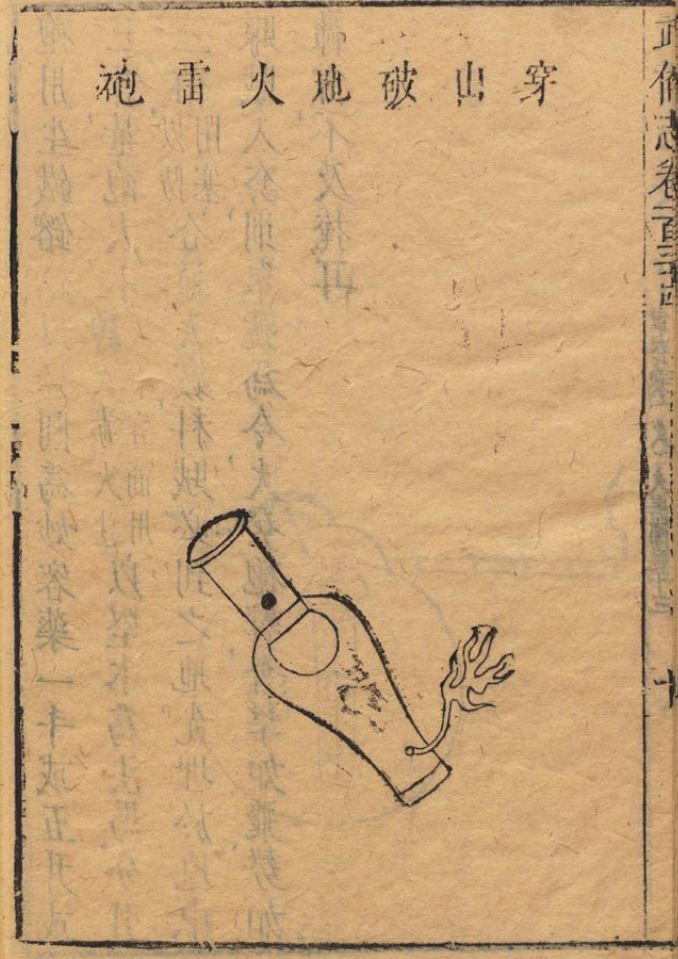

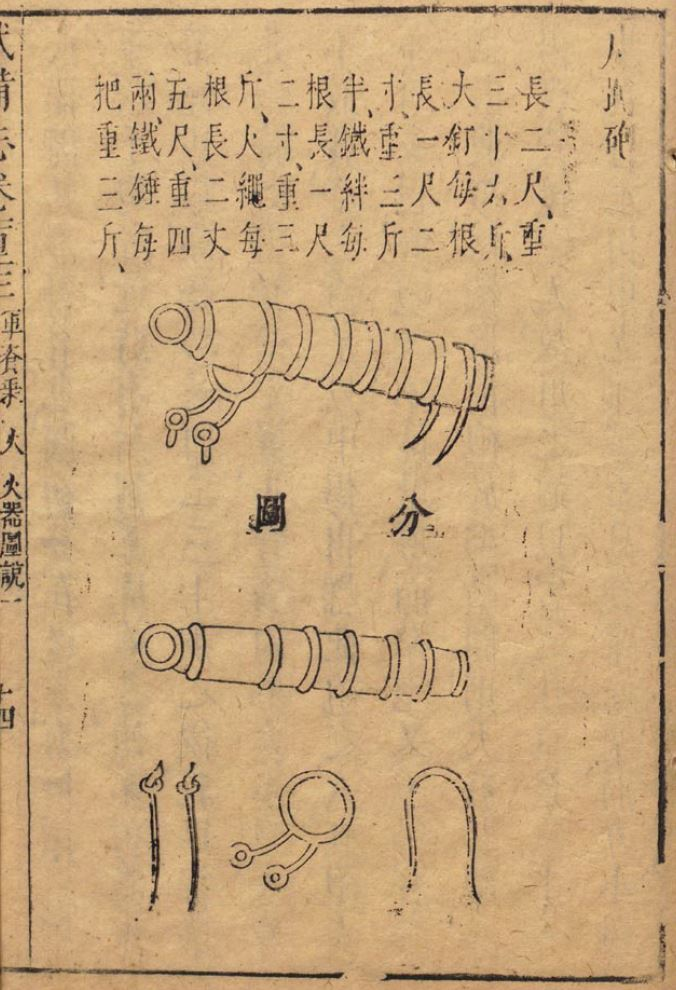

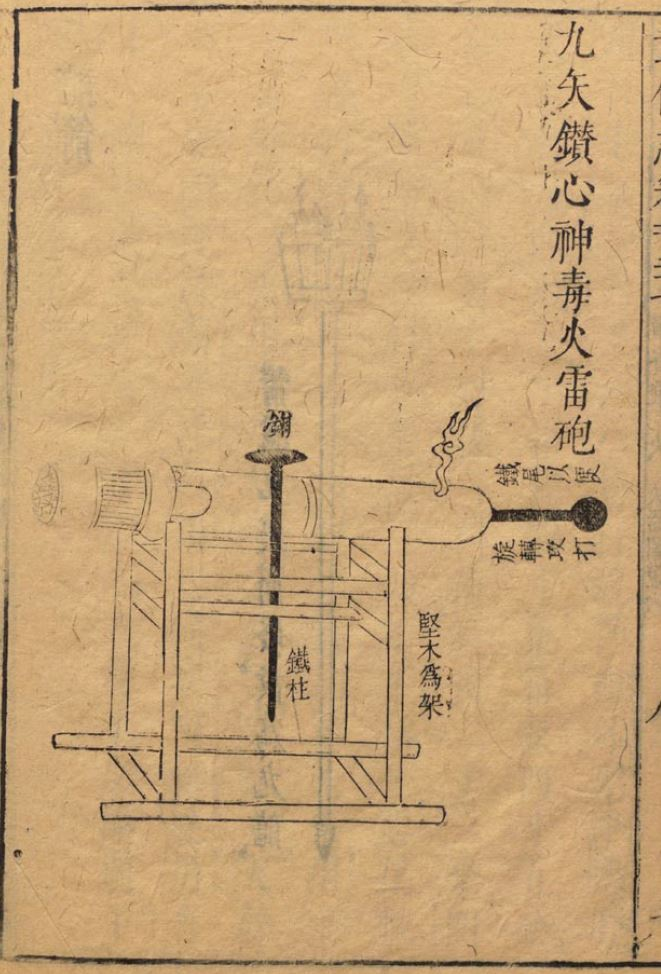

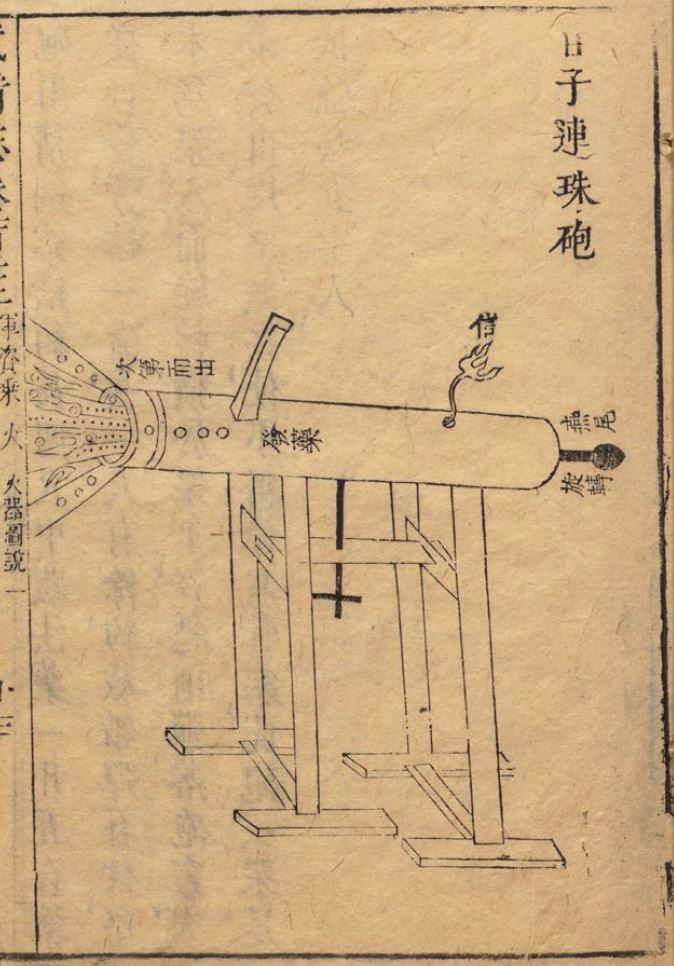

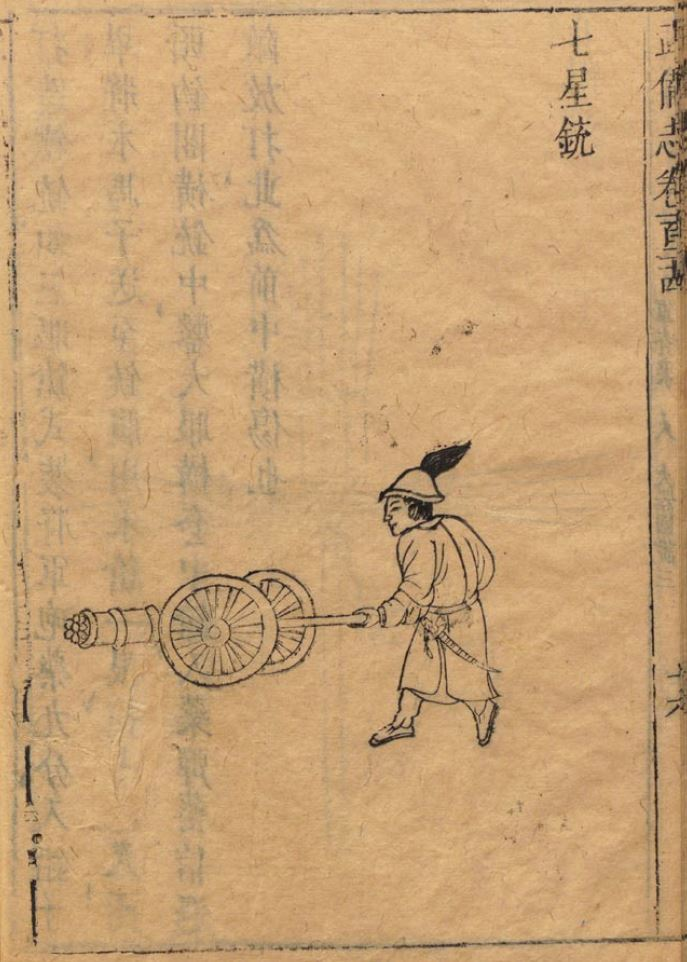

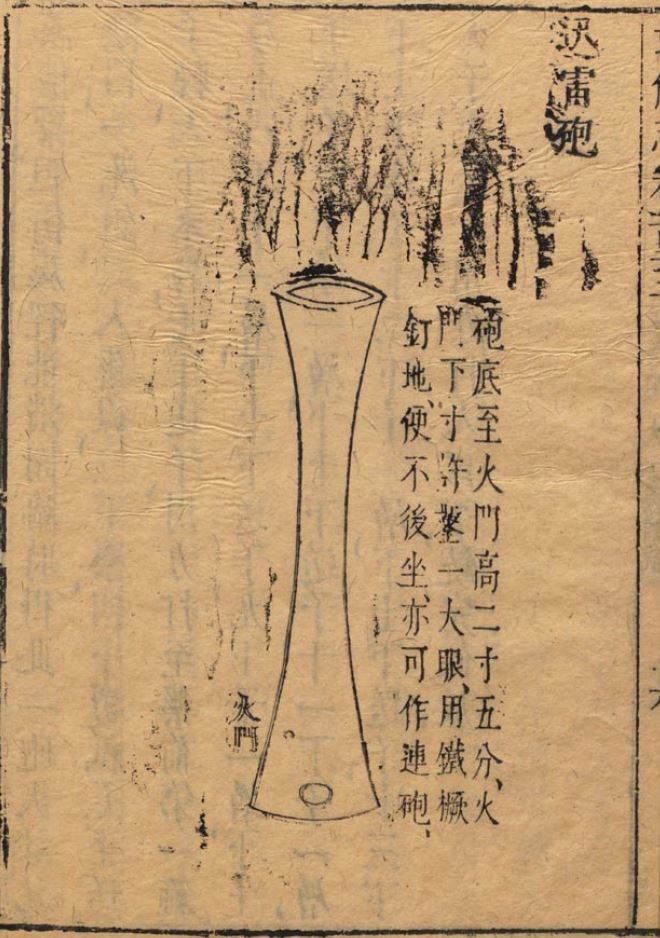

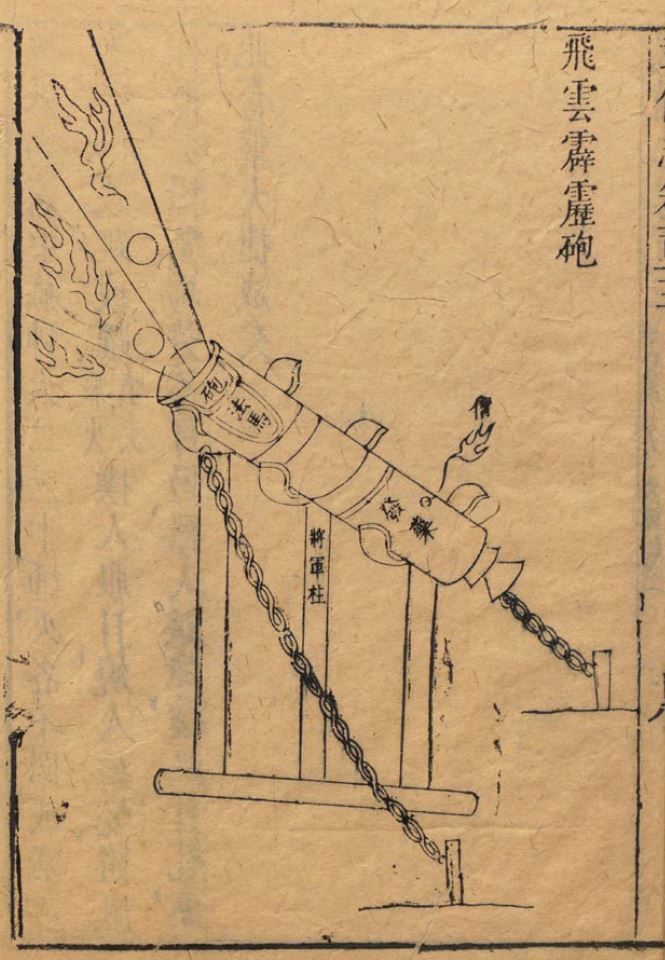

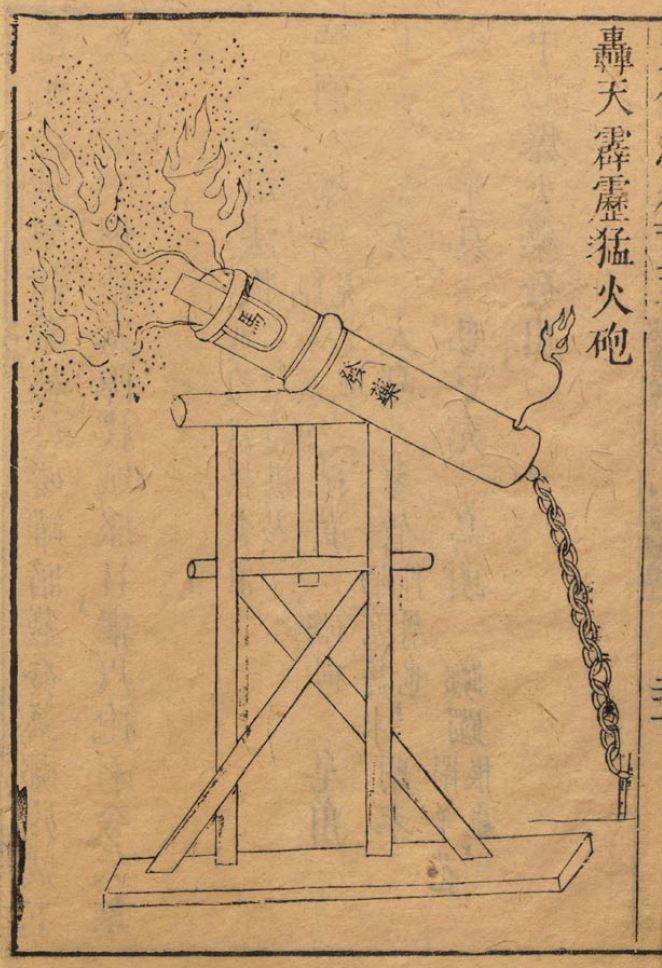

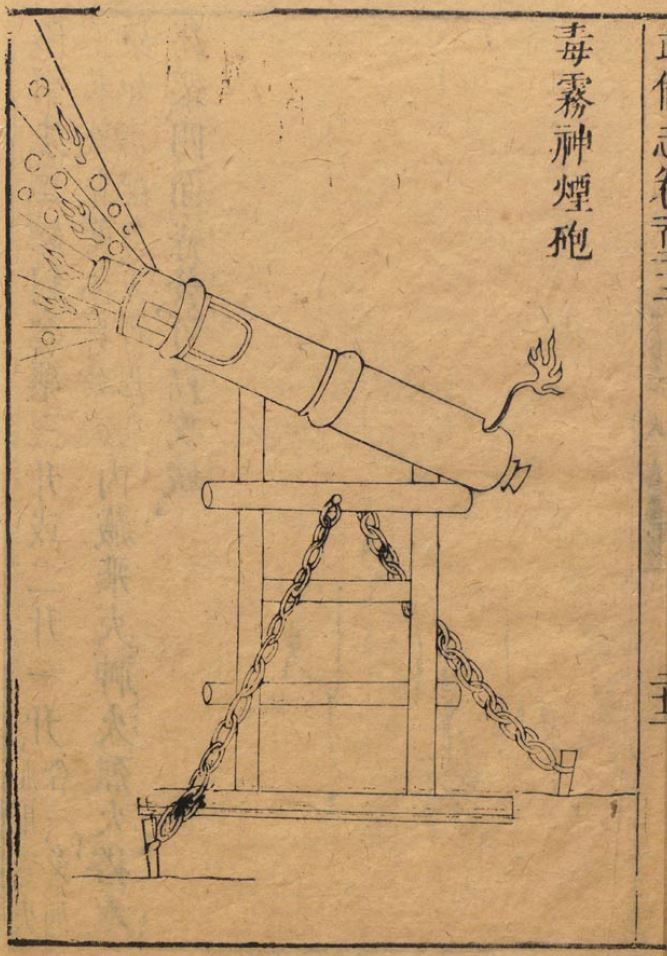

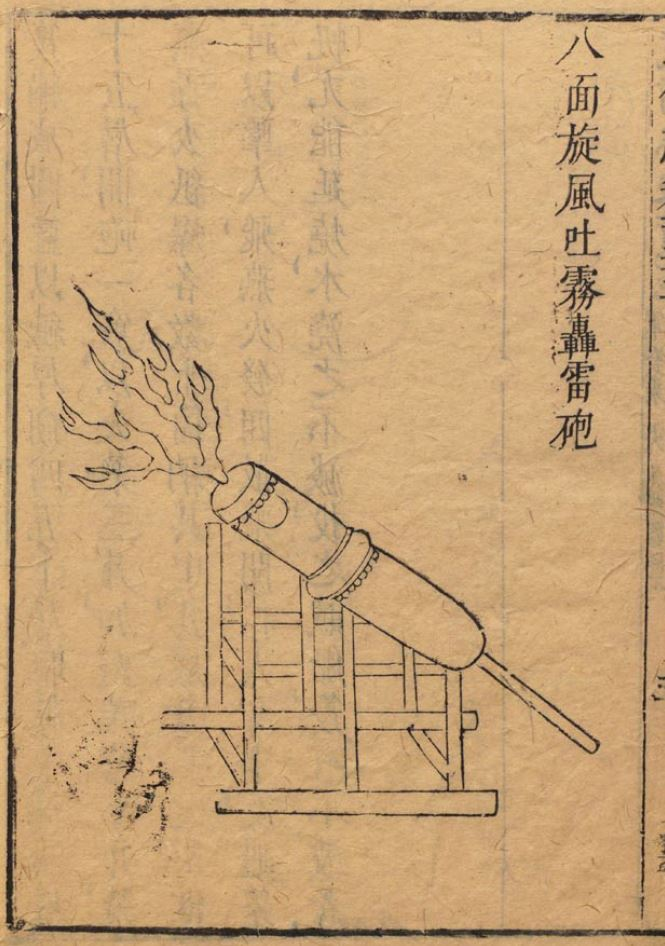

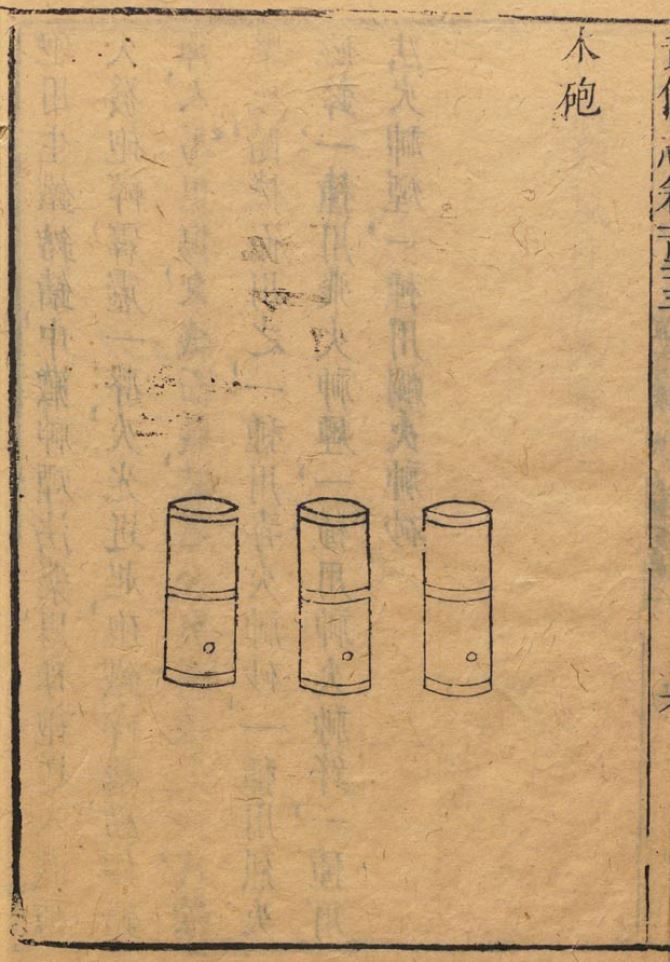

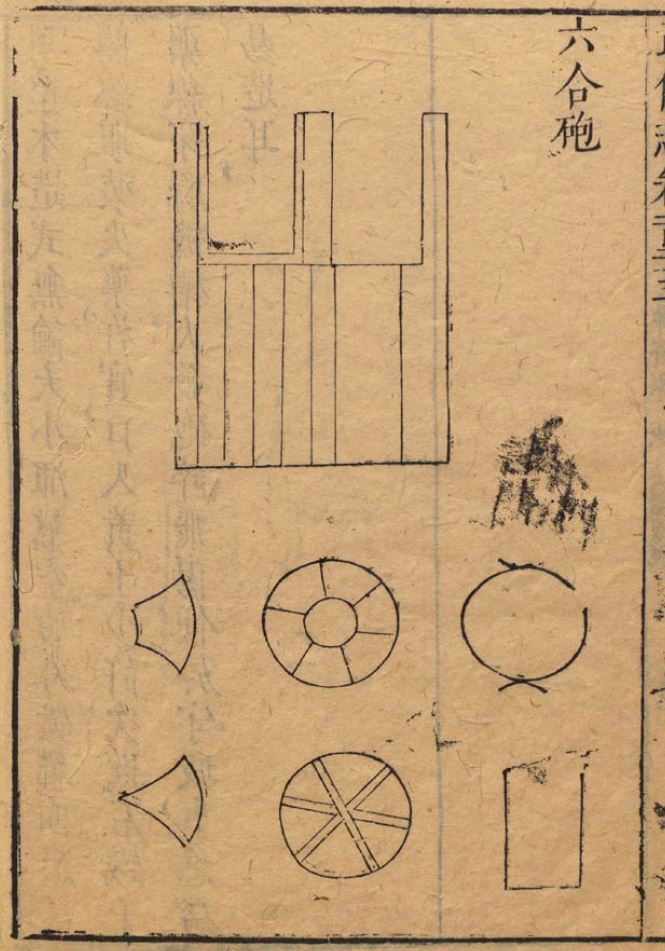

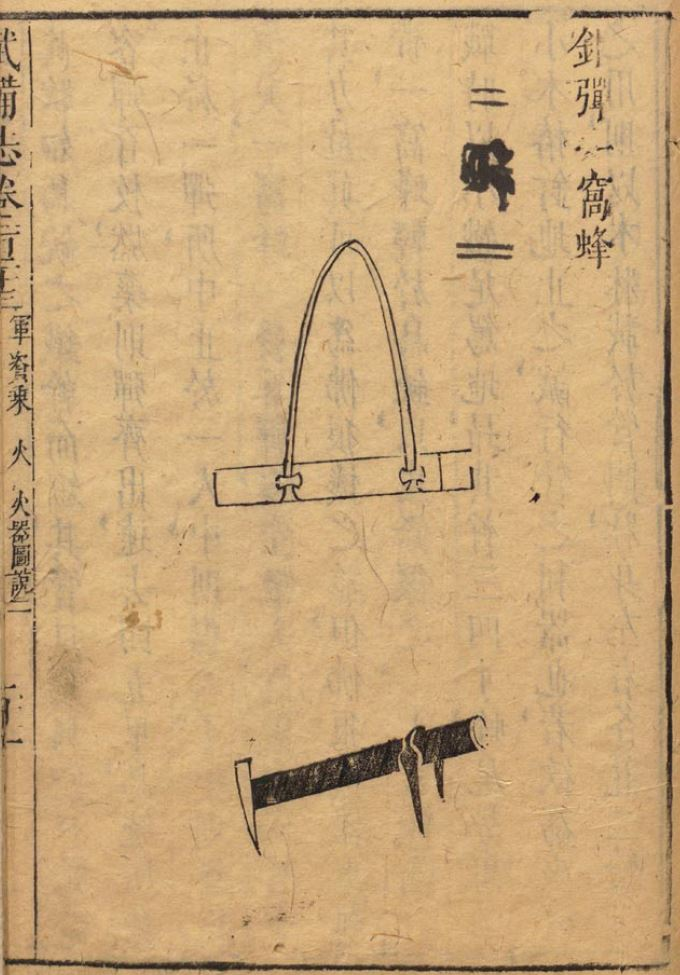

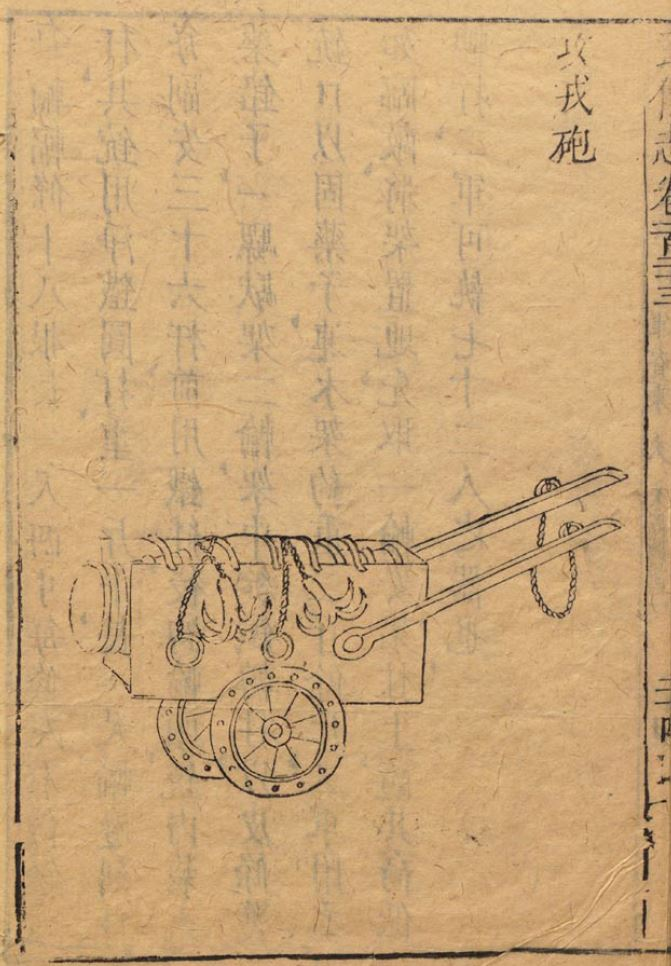

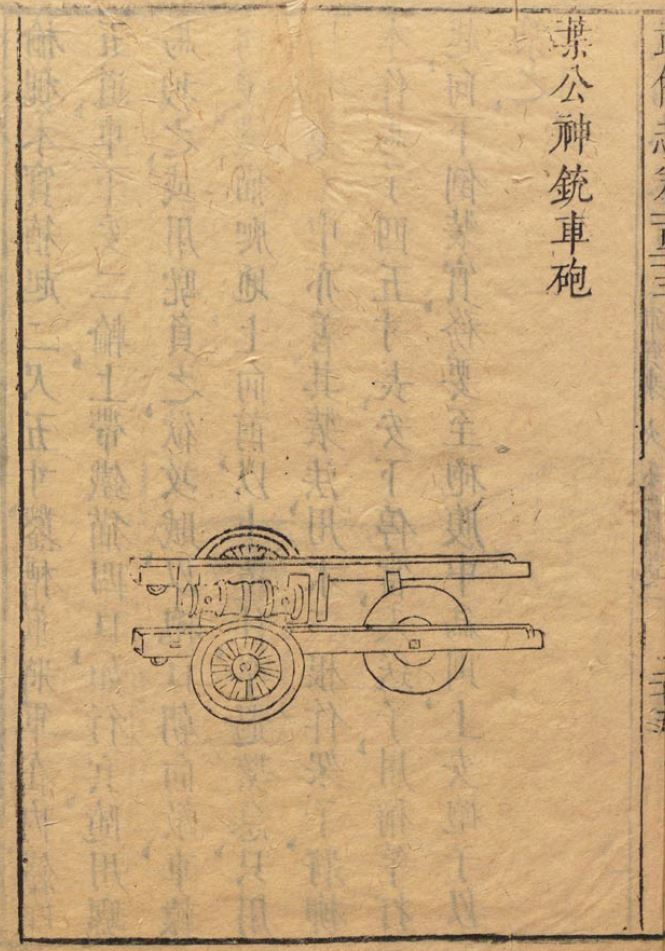

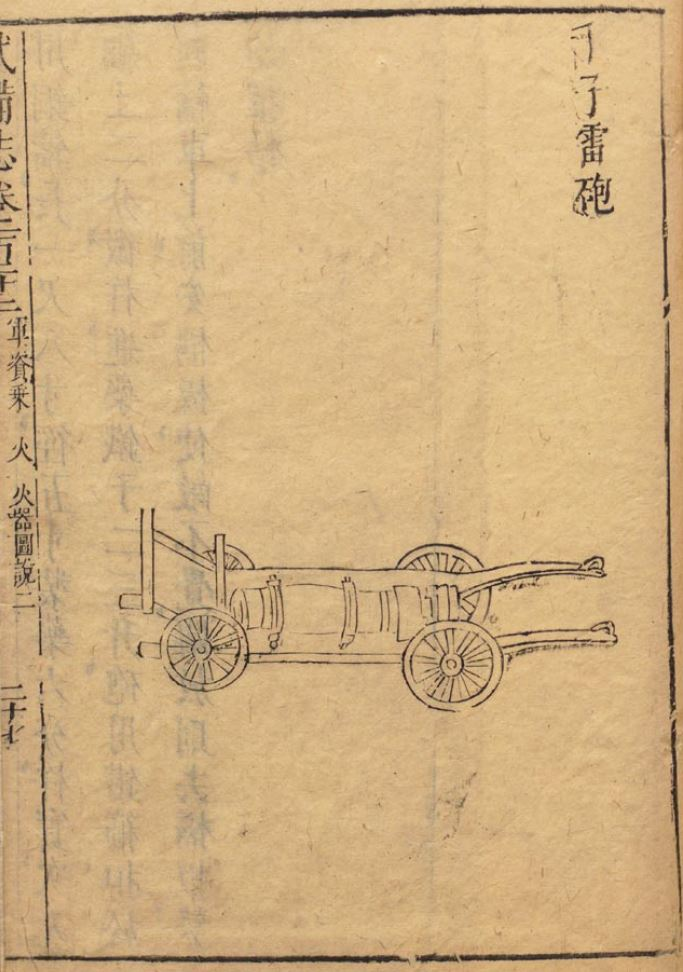

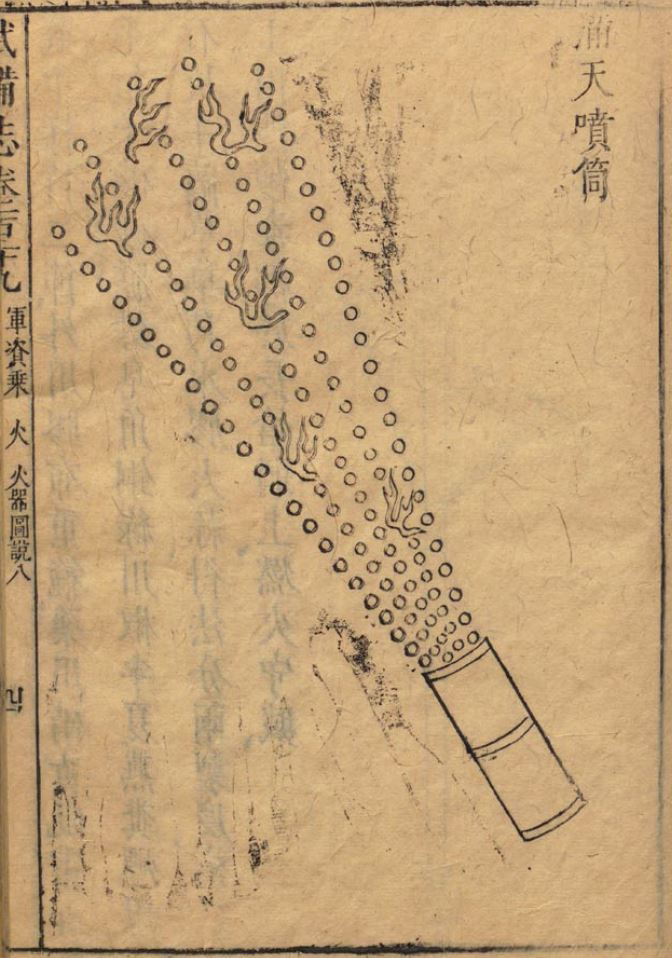

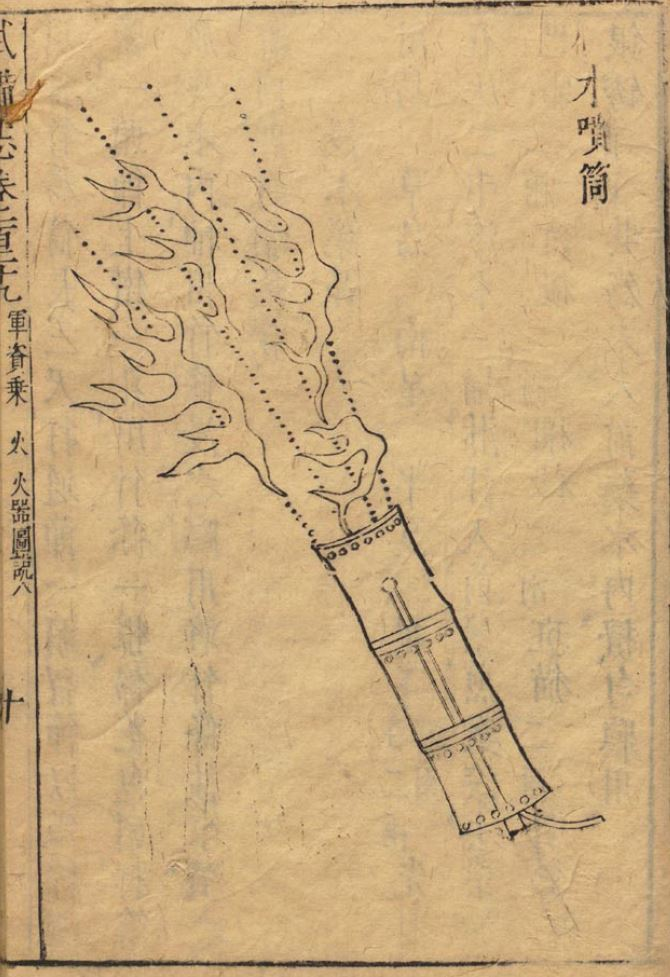

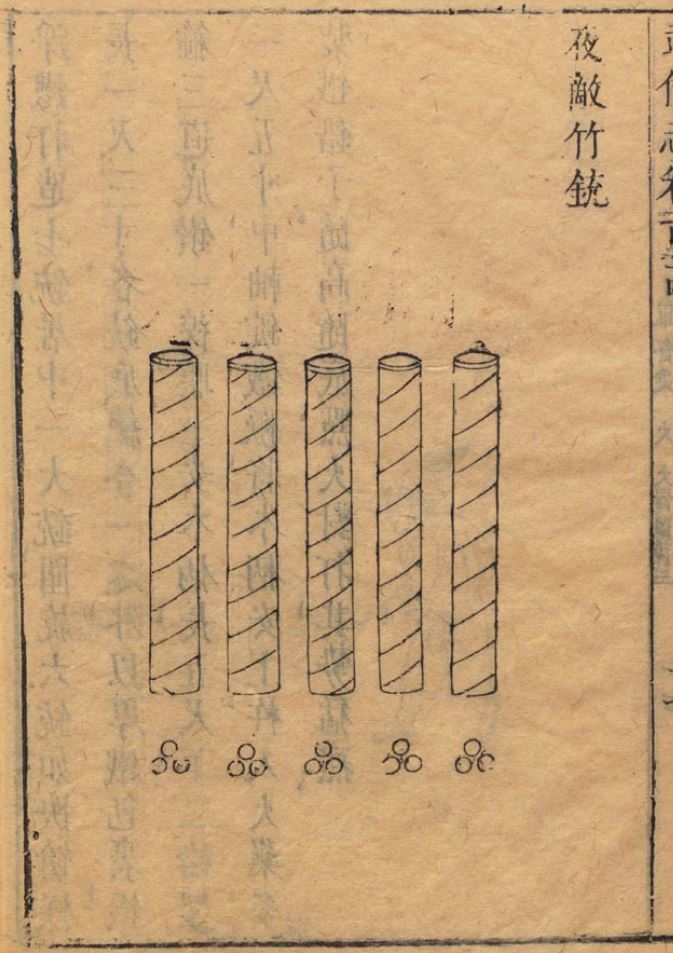

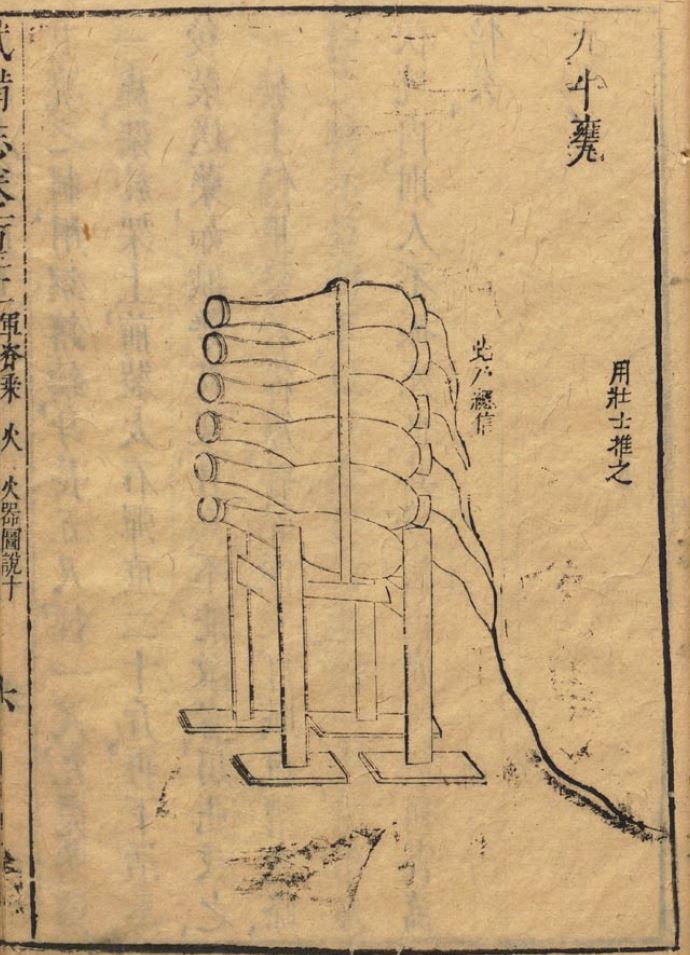

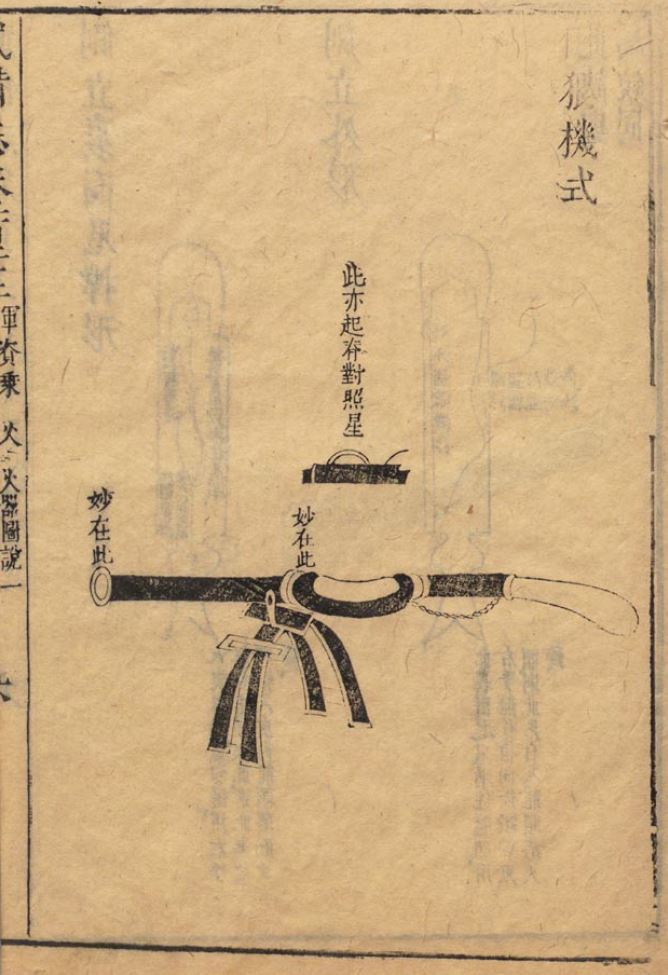

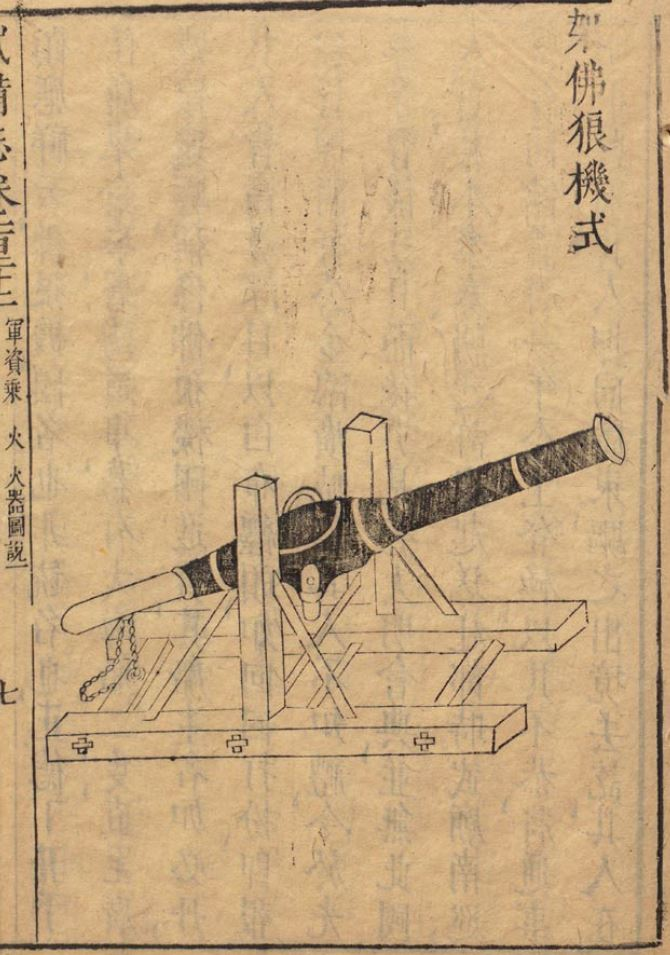

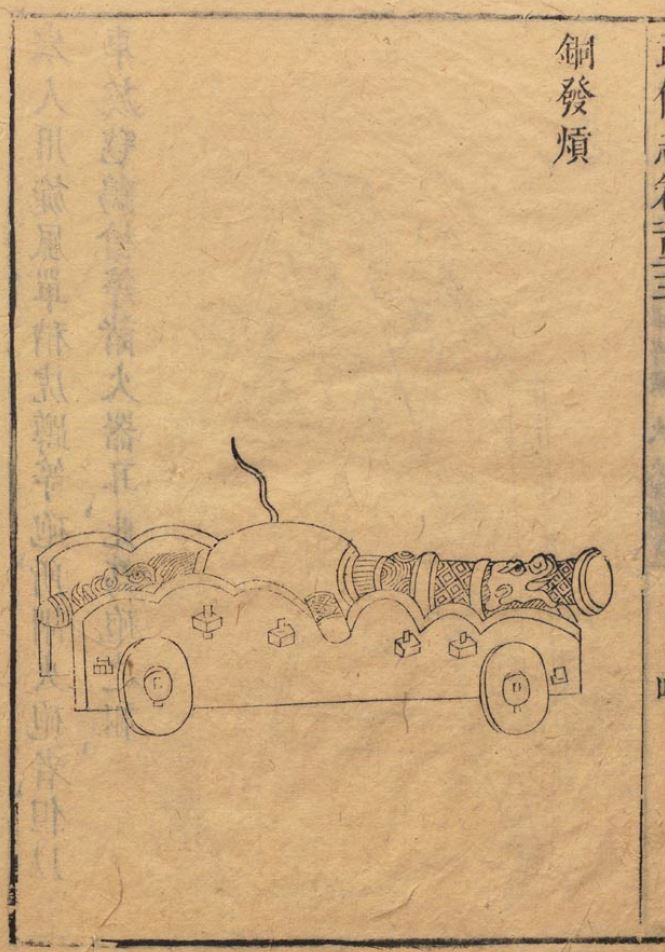

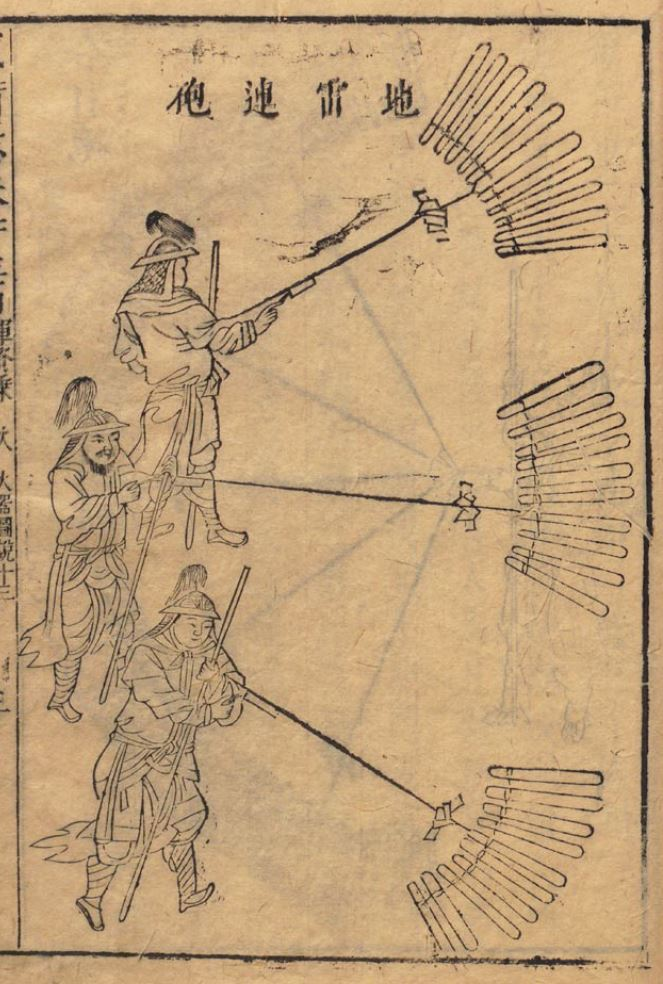

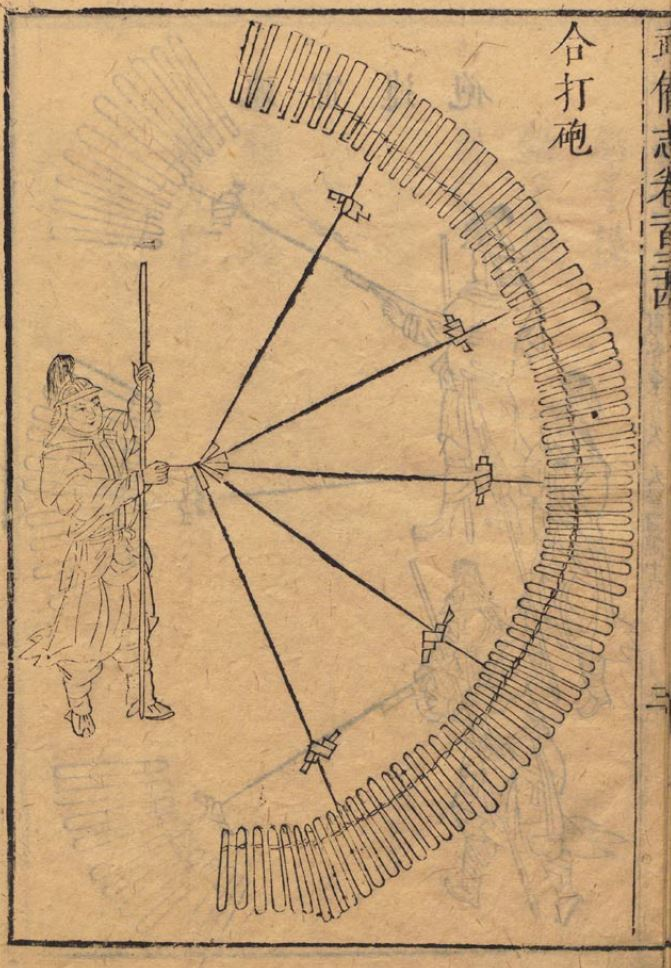

=== Explosives ===
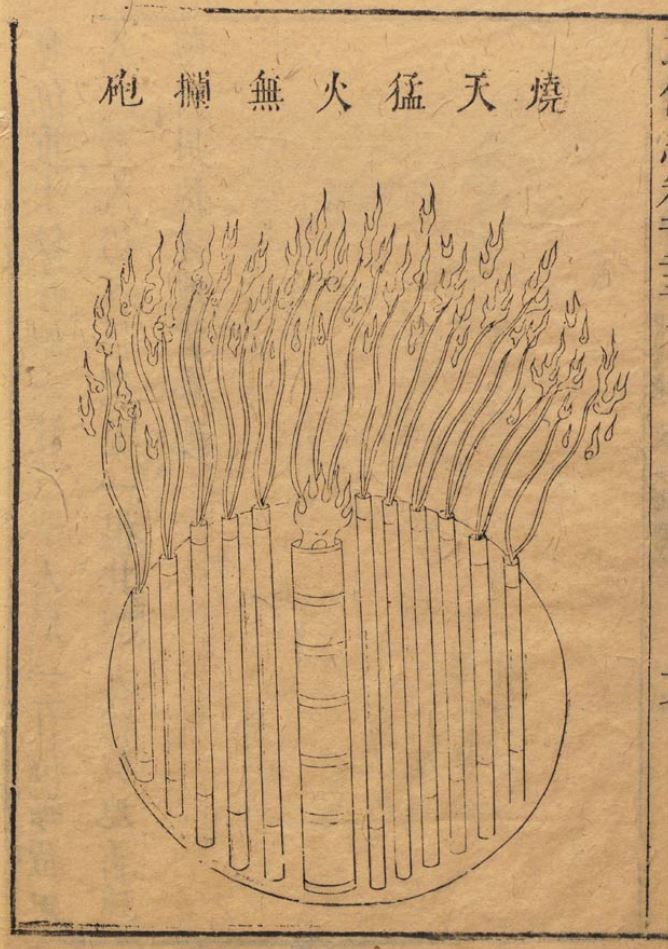

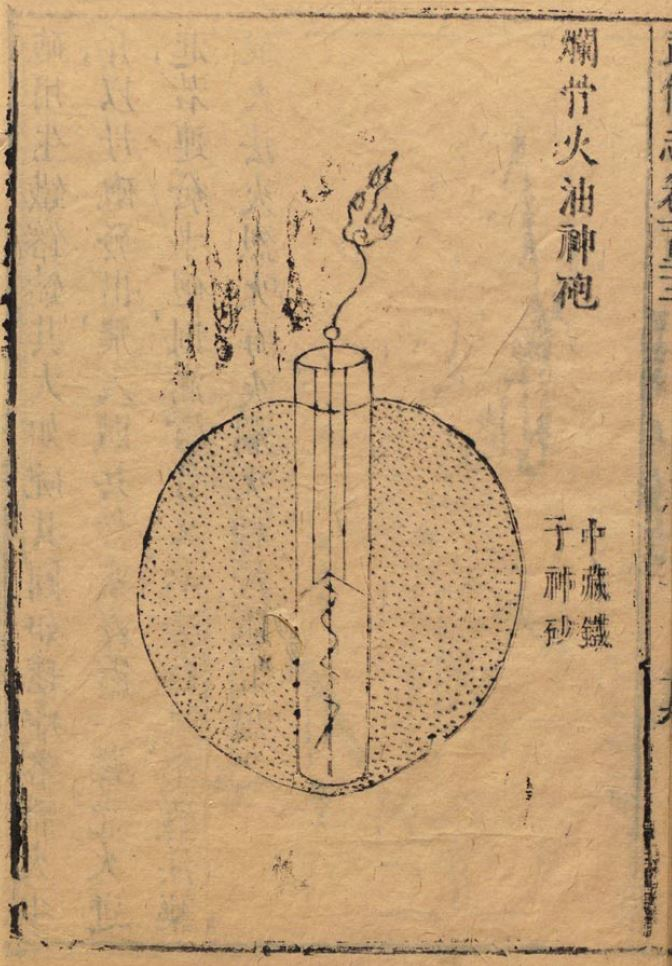

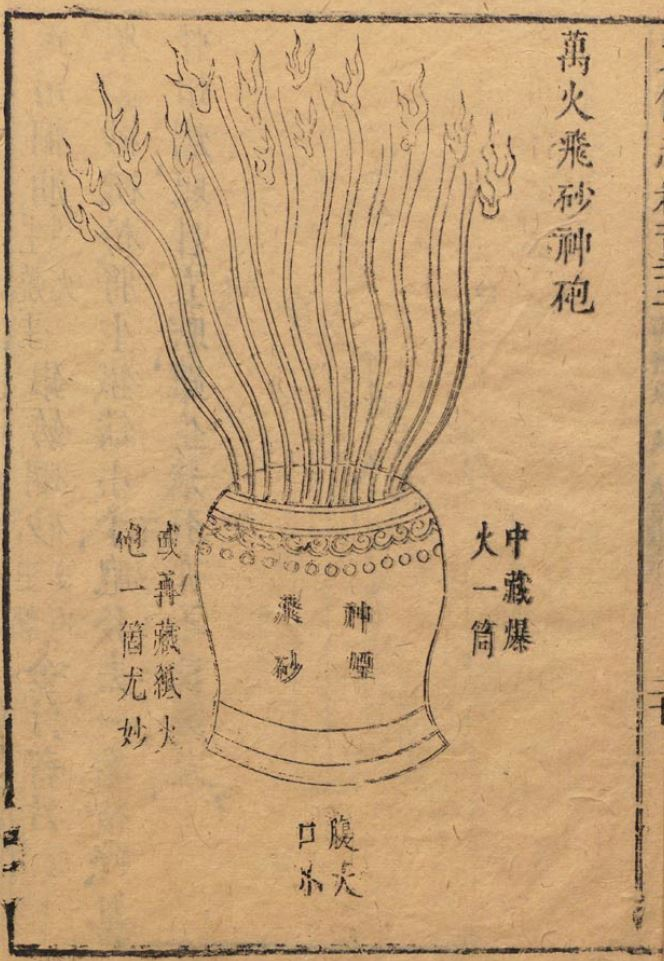

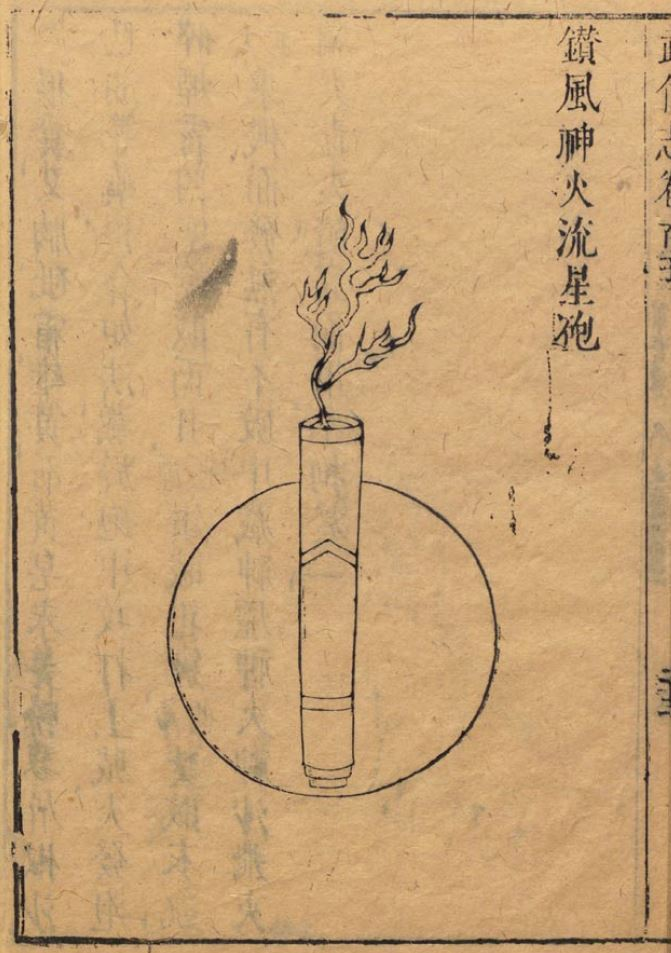

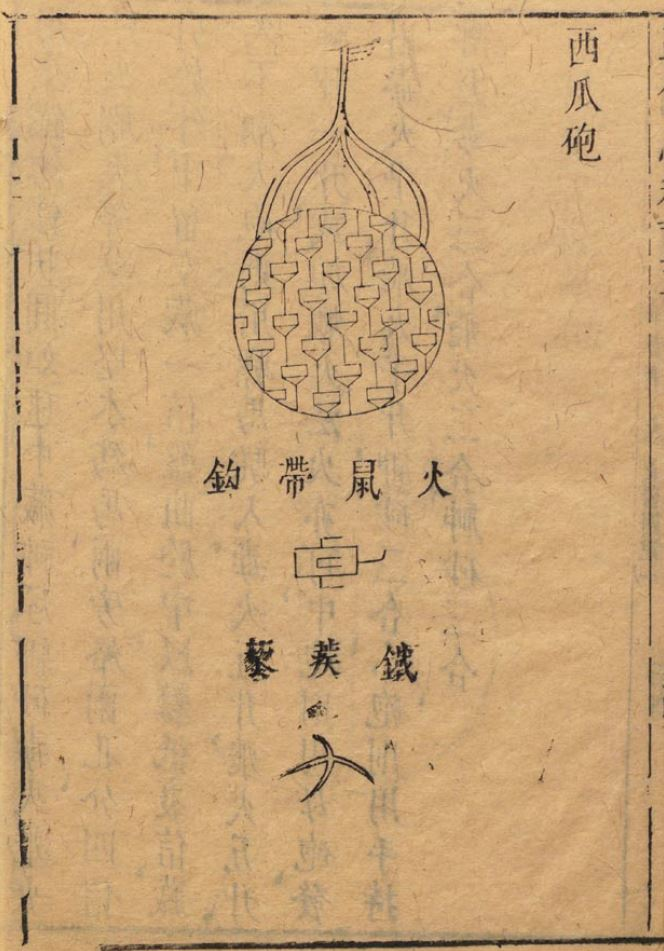

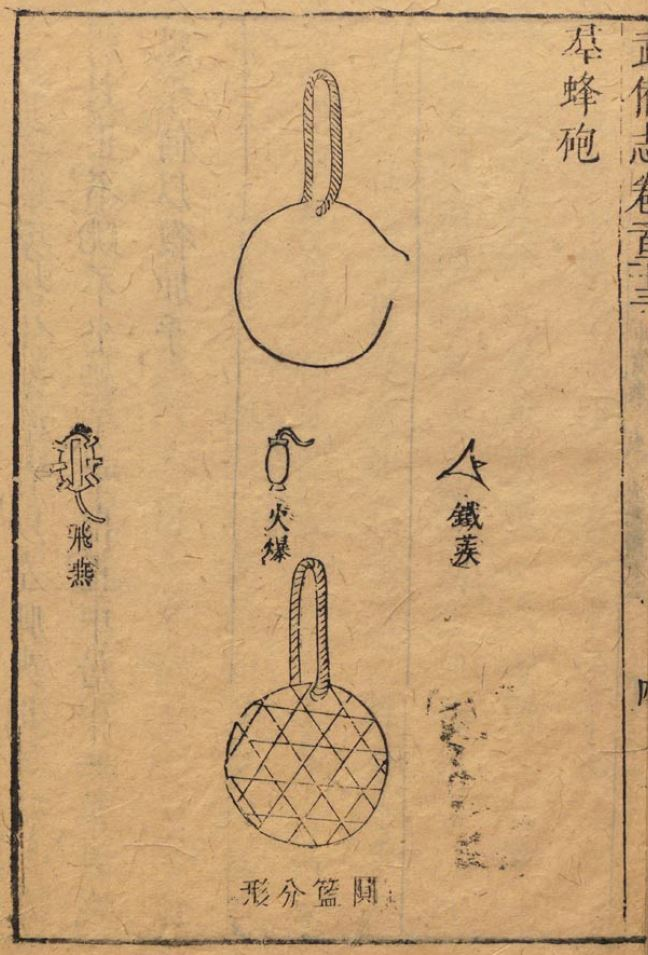

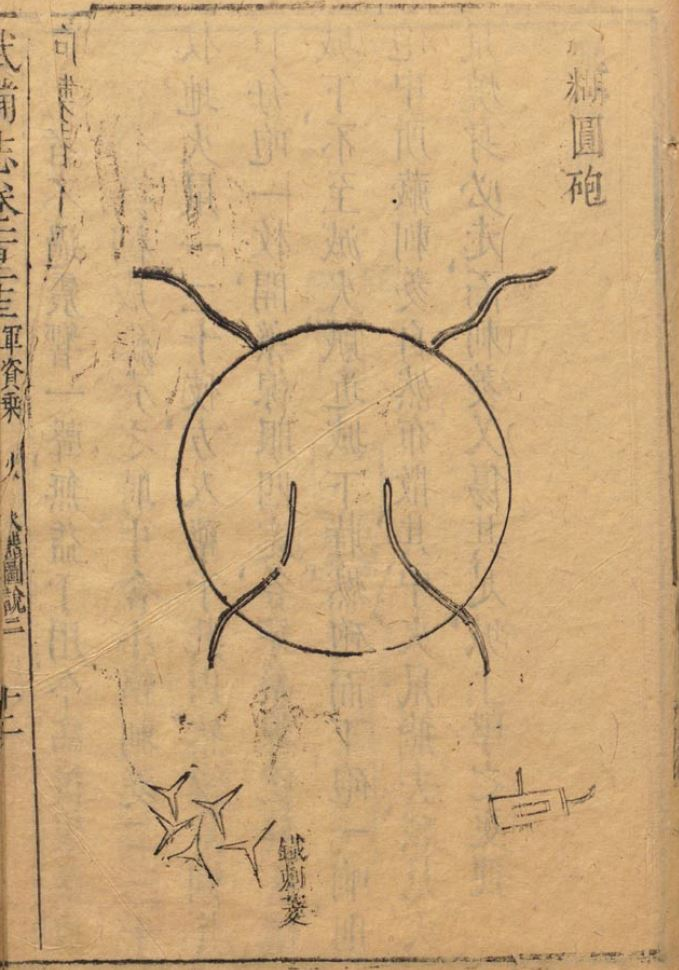

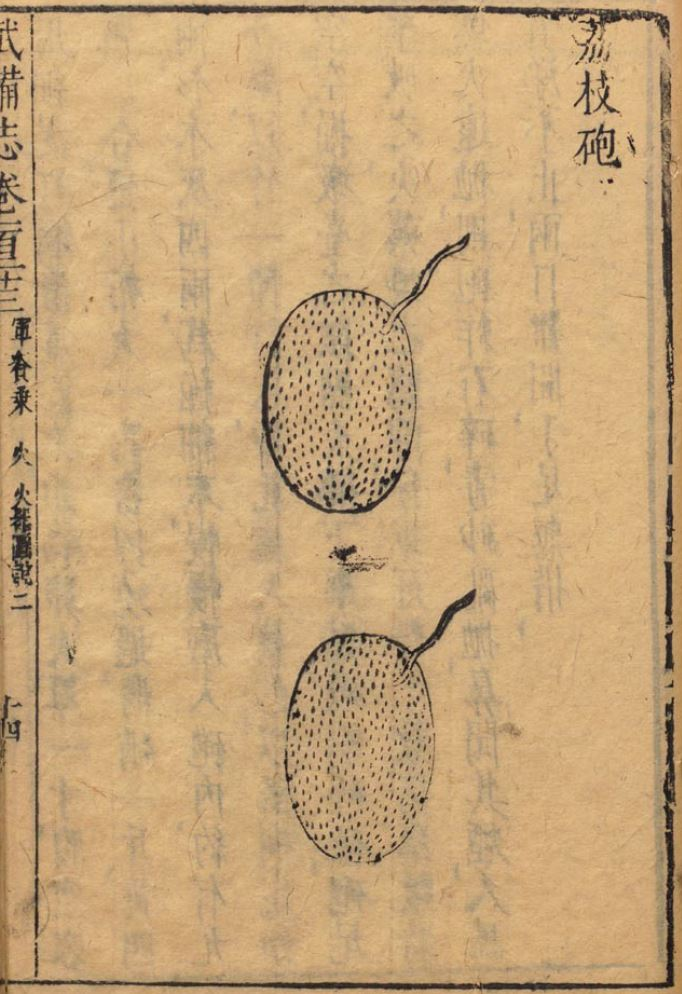

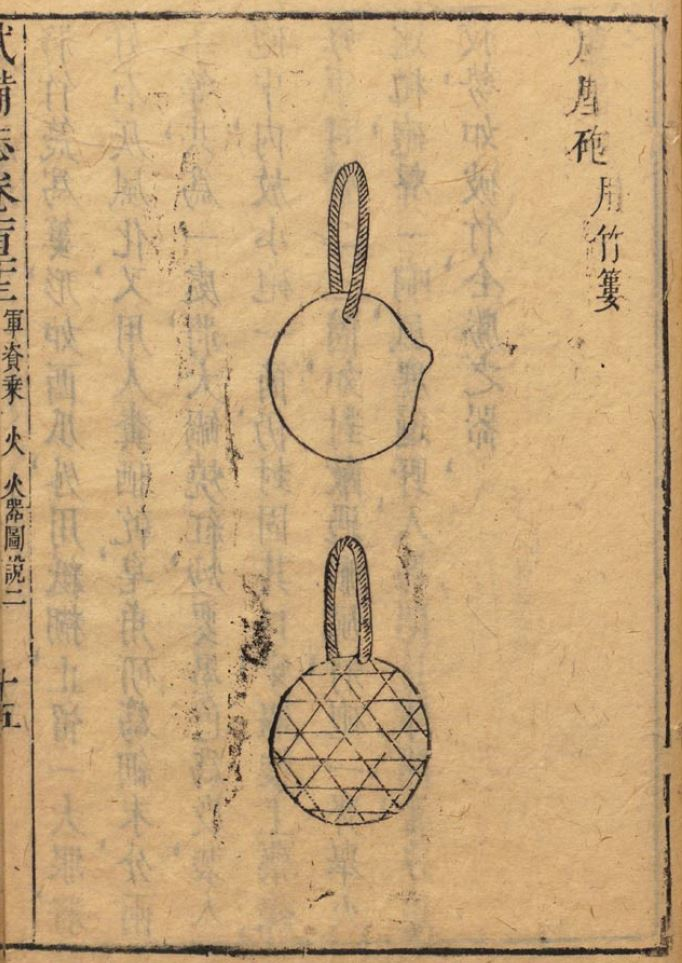

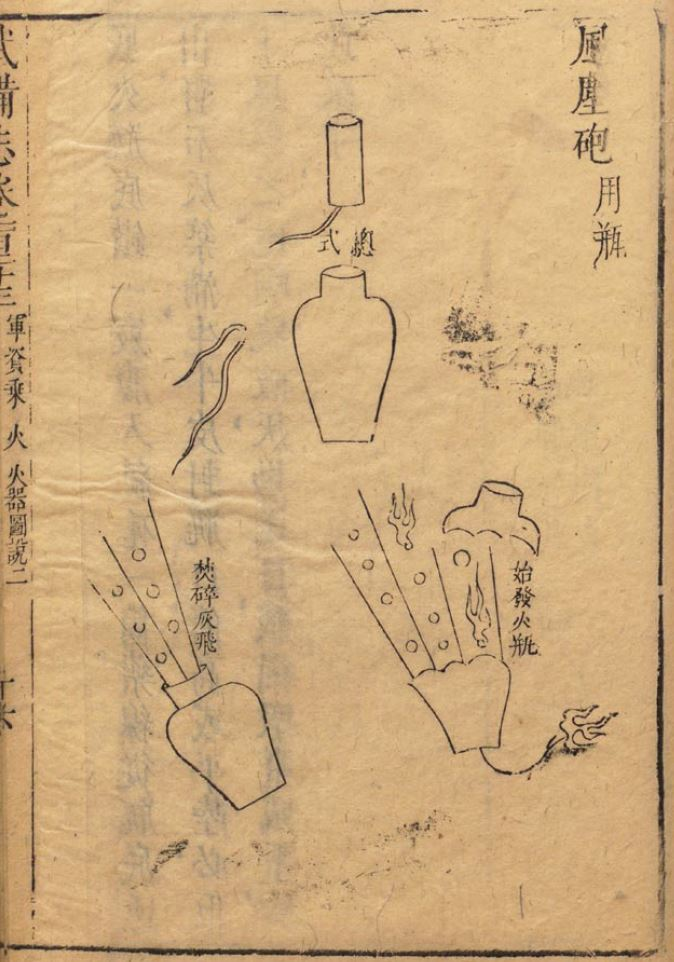

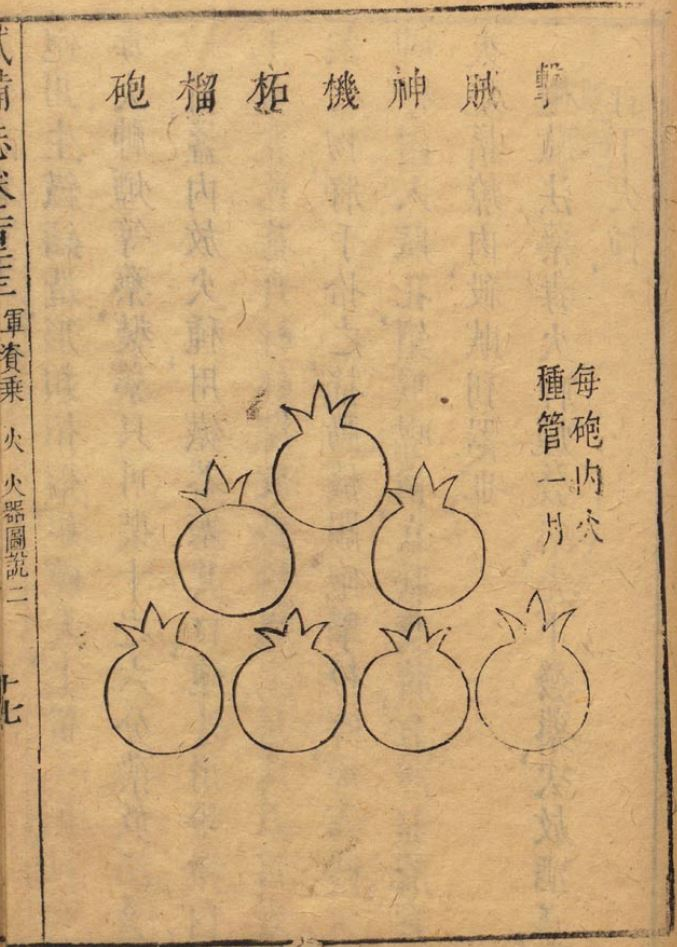

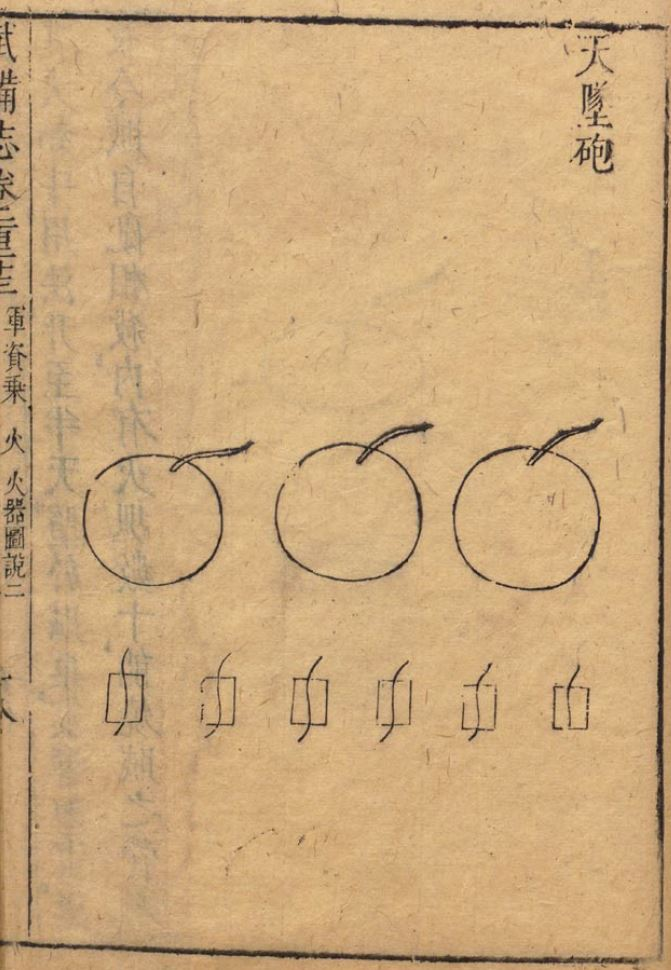

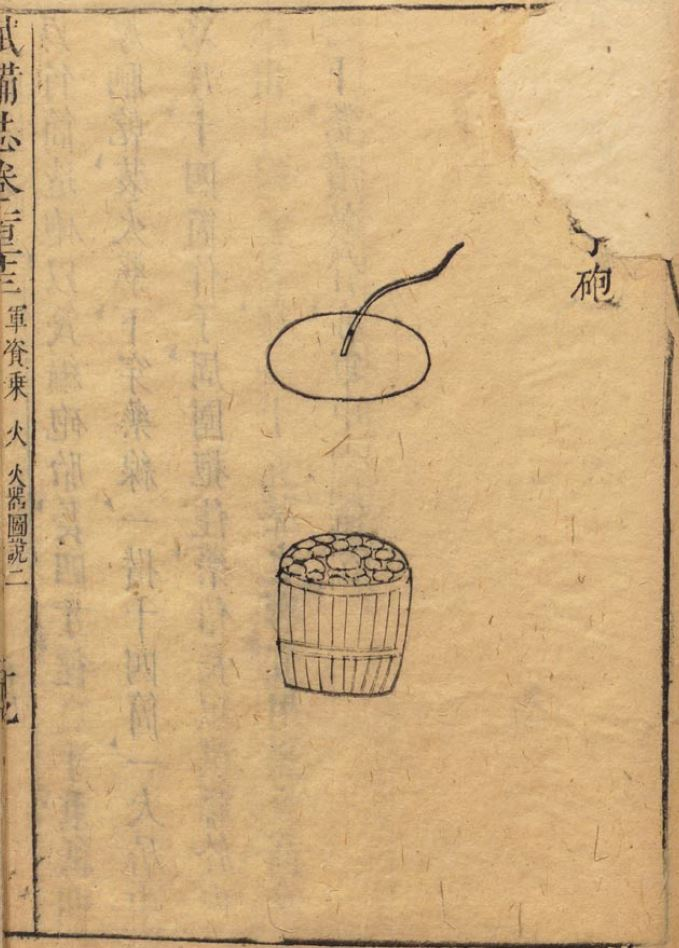

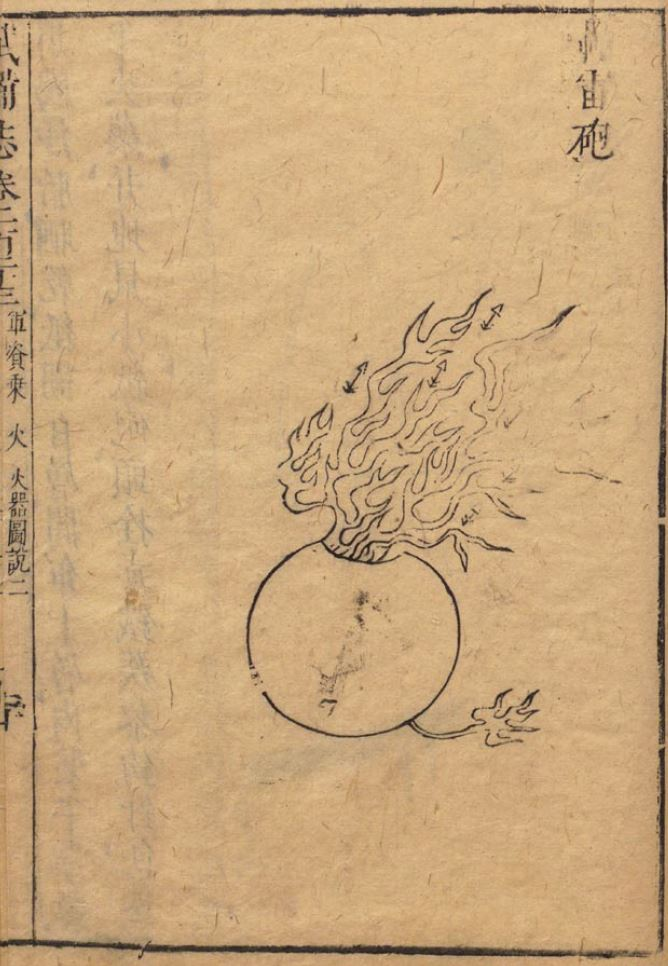

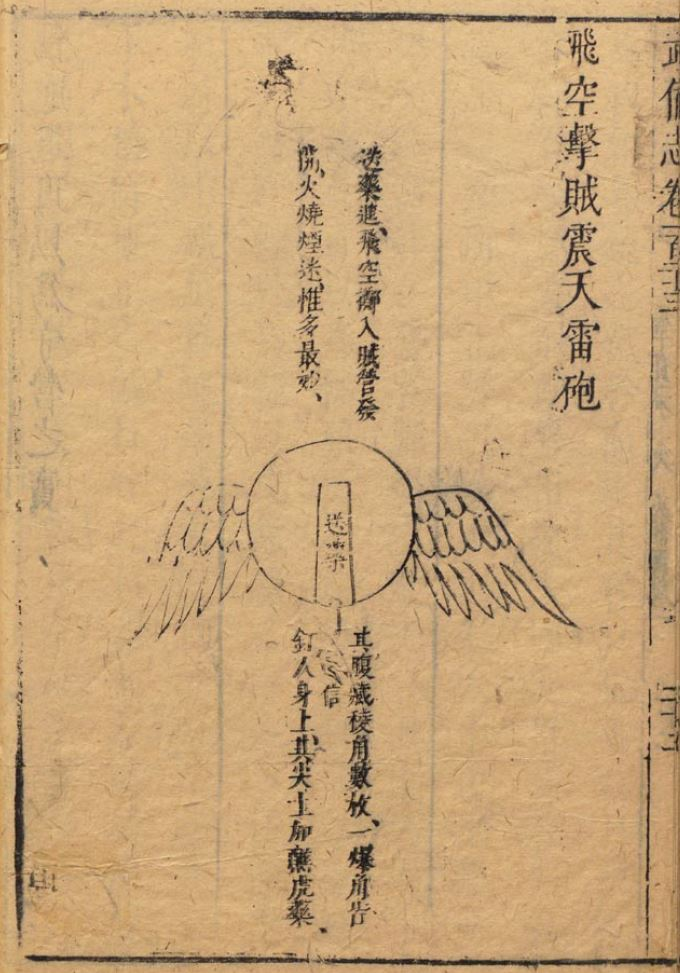

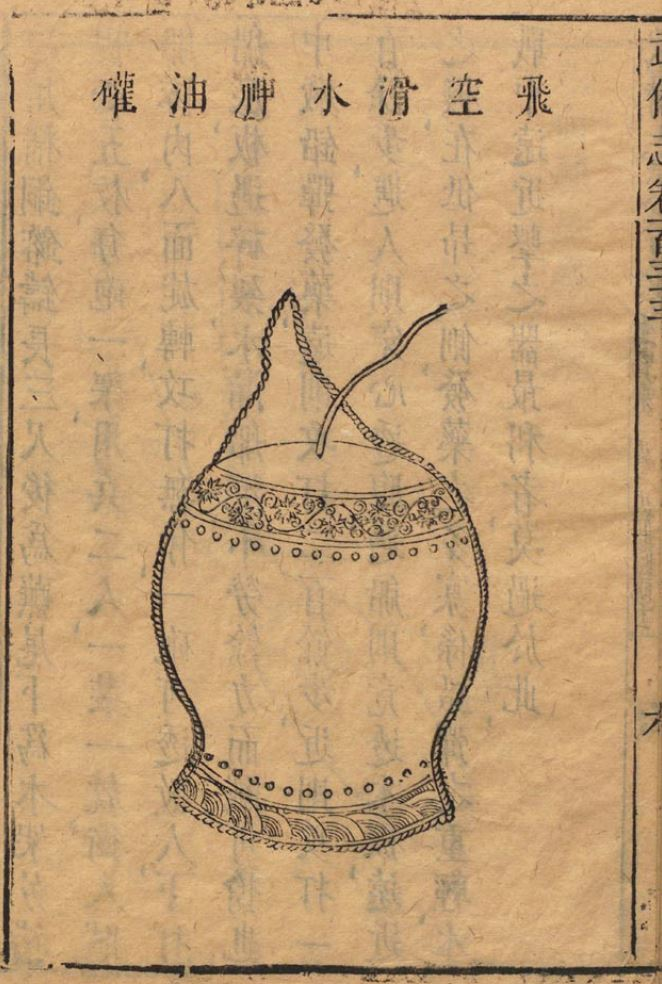

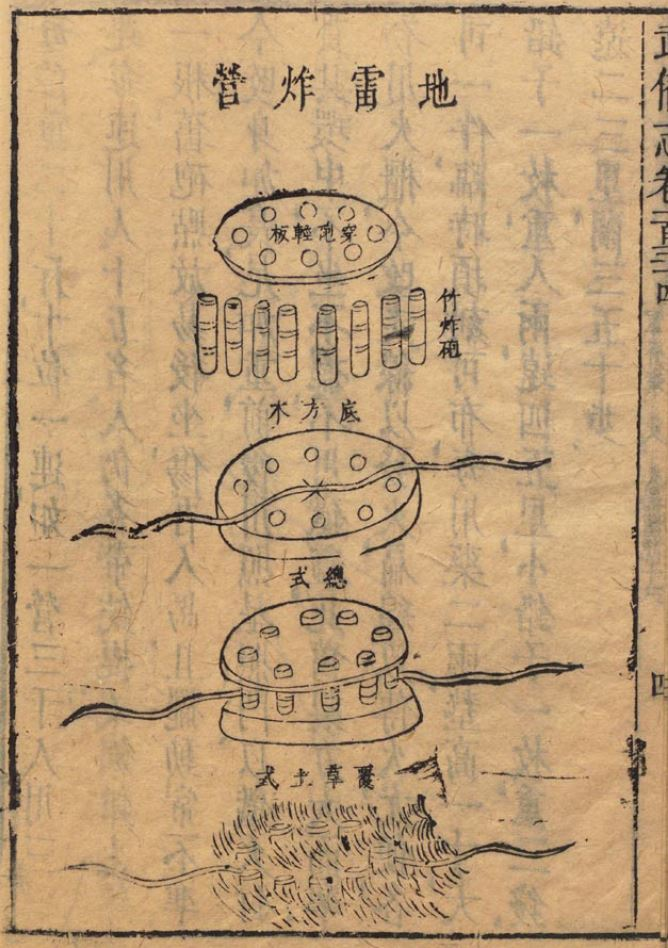

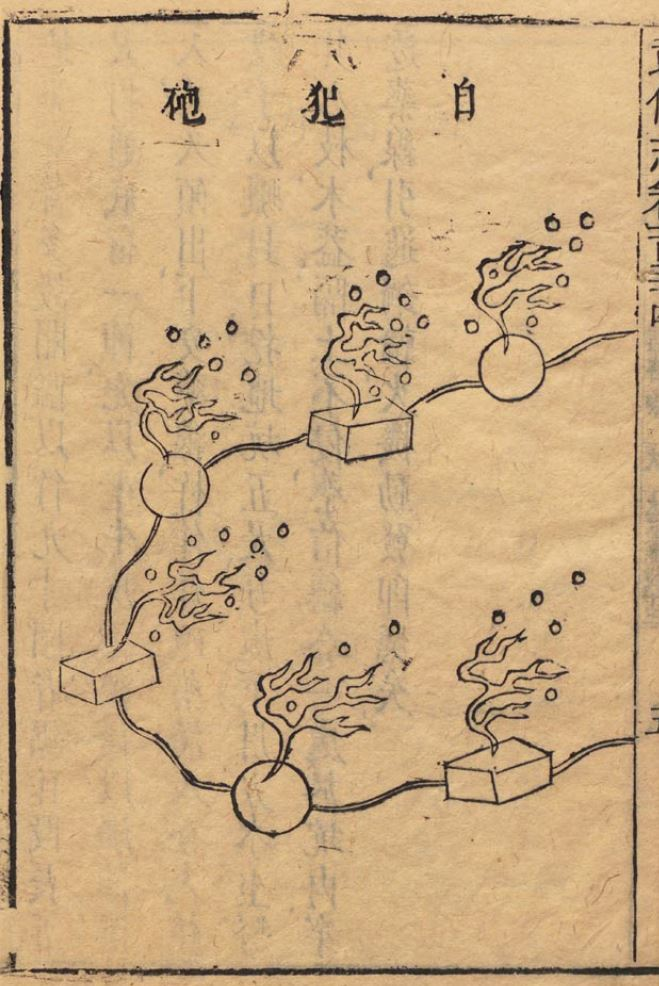

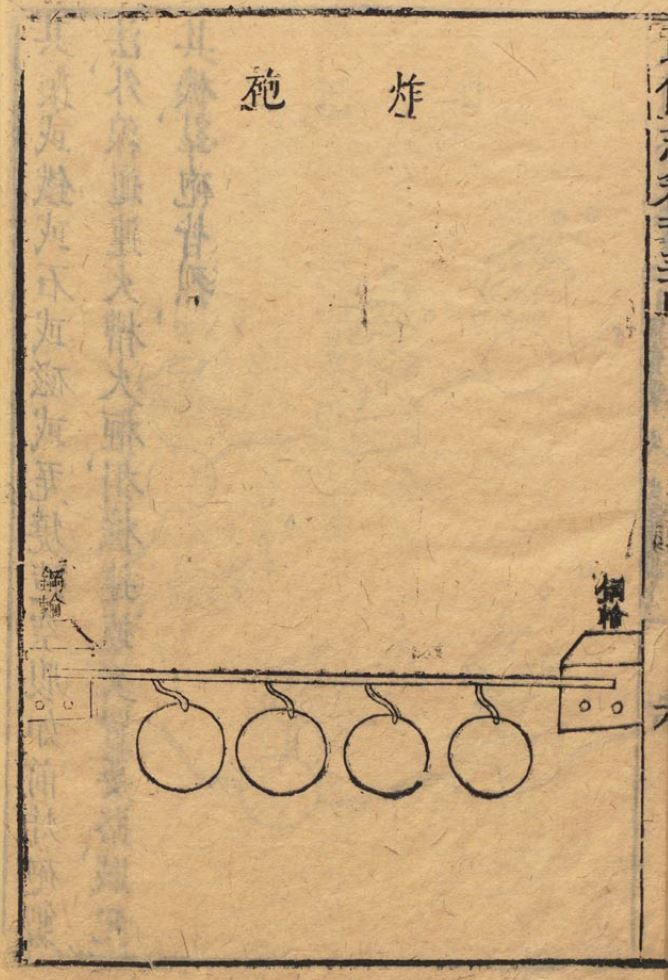

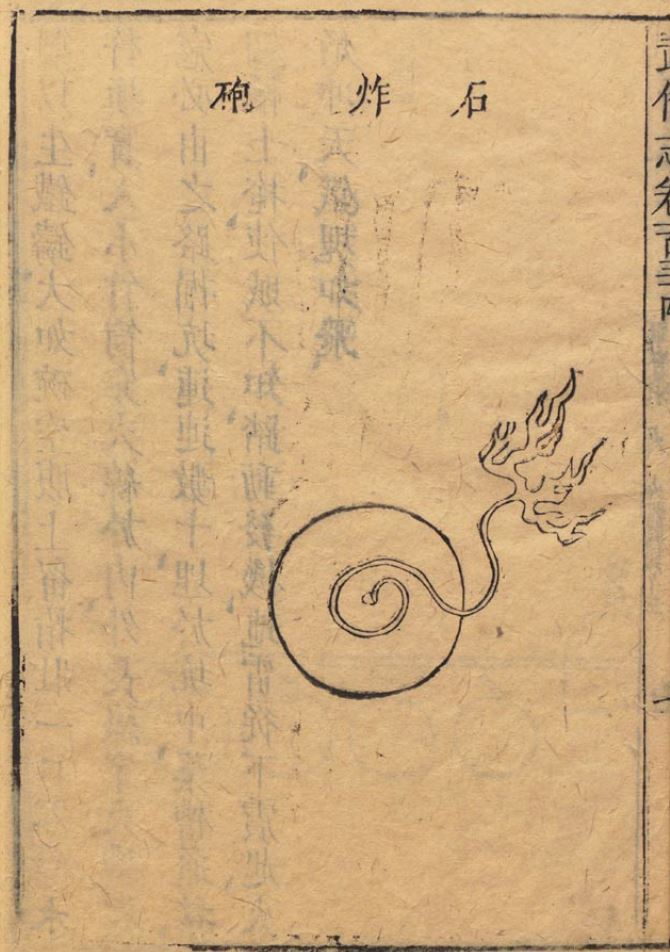

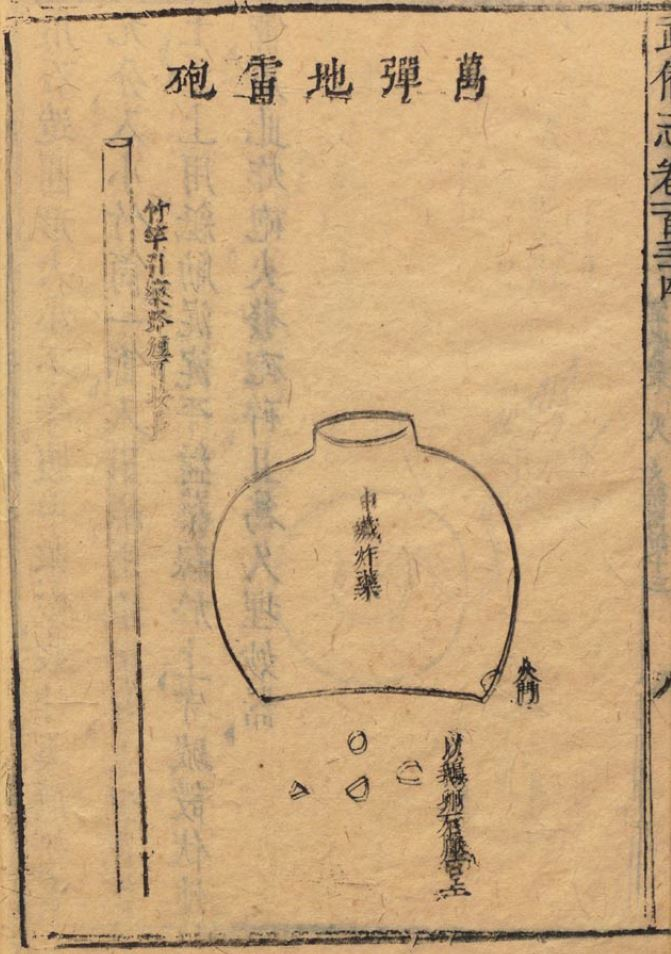

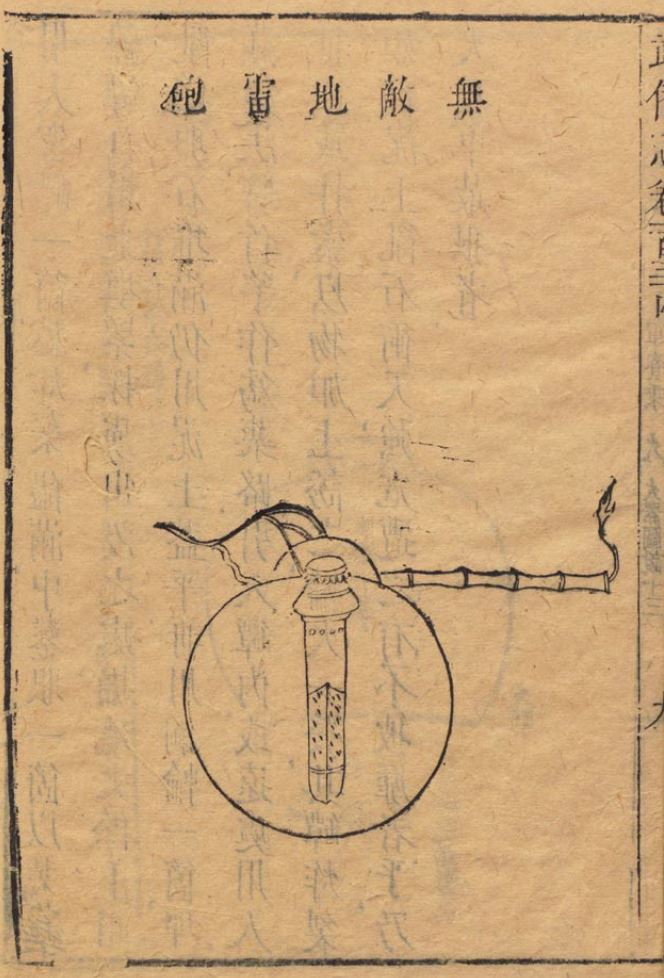

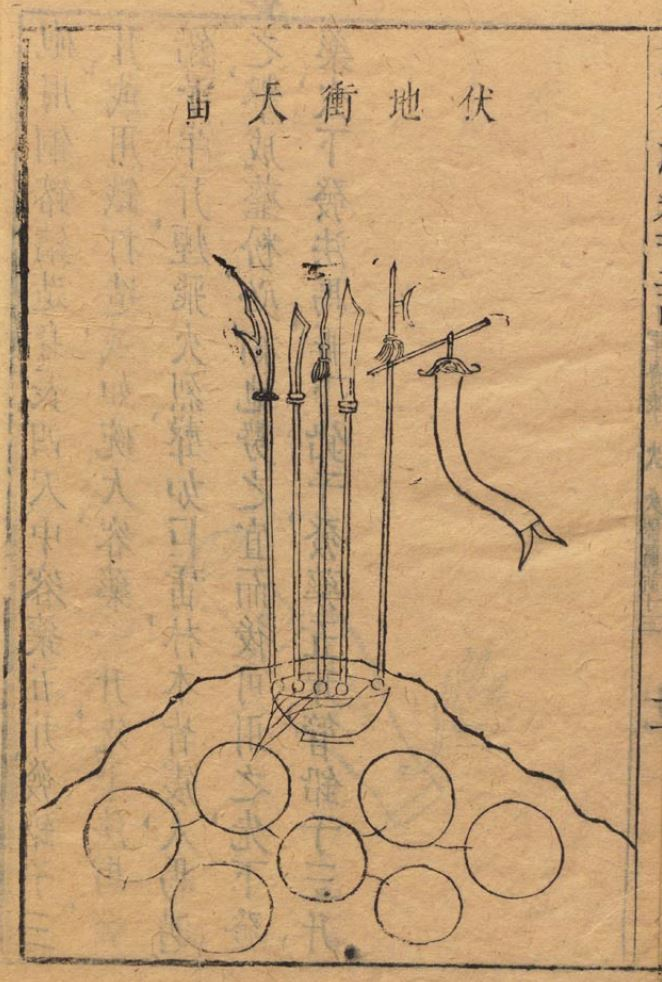

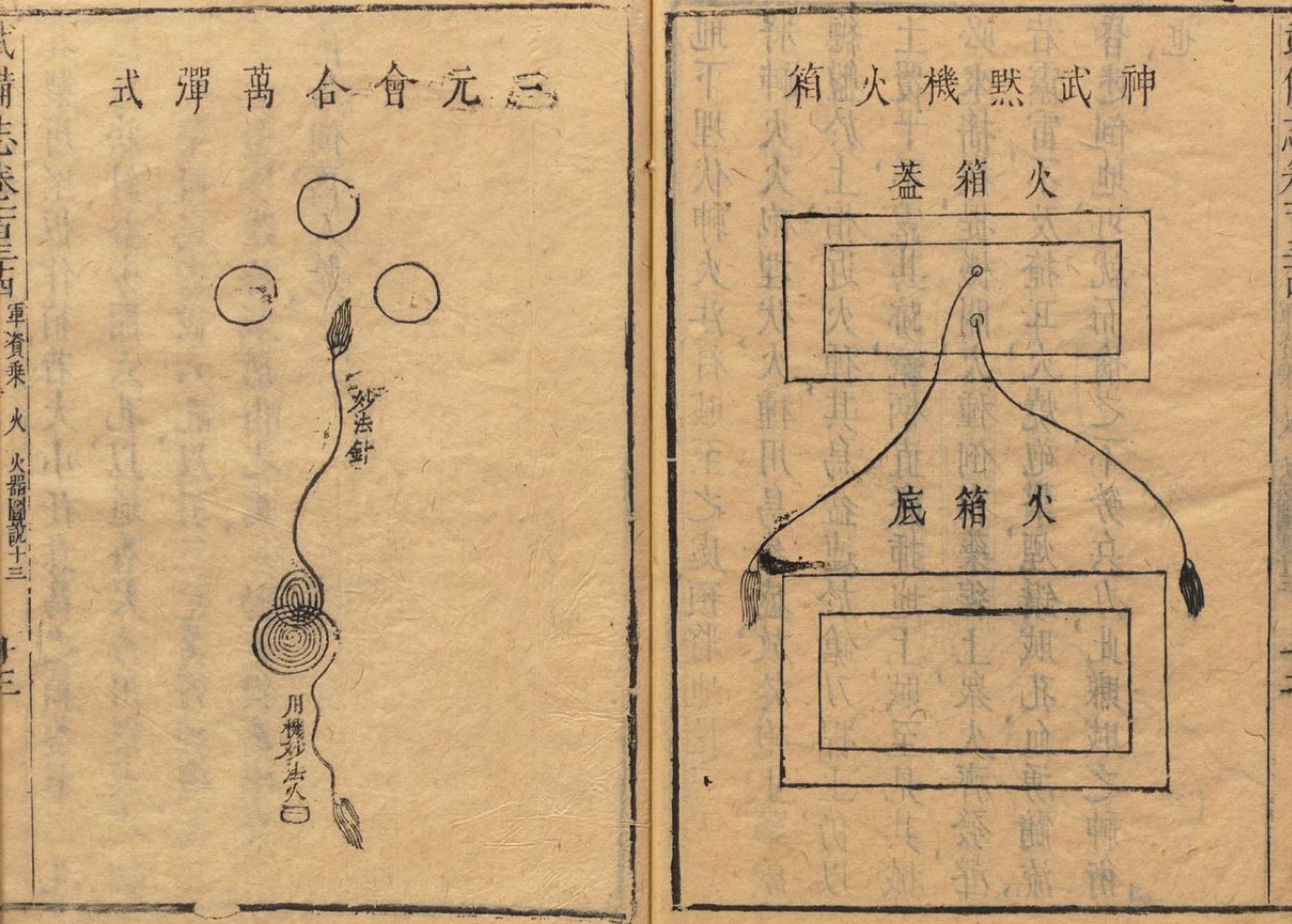

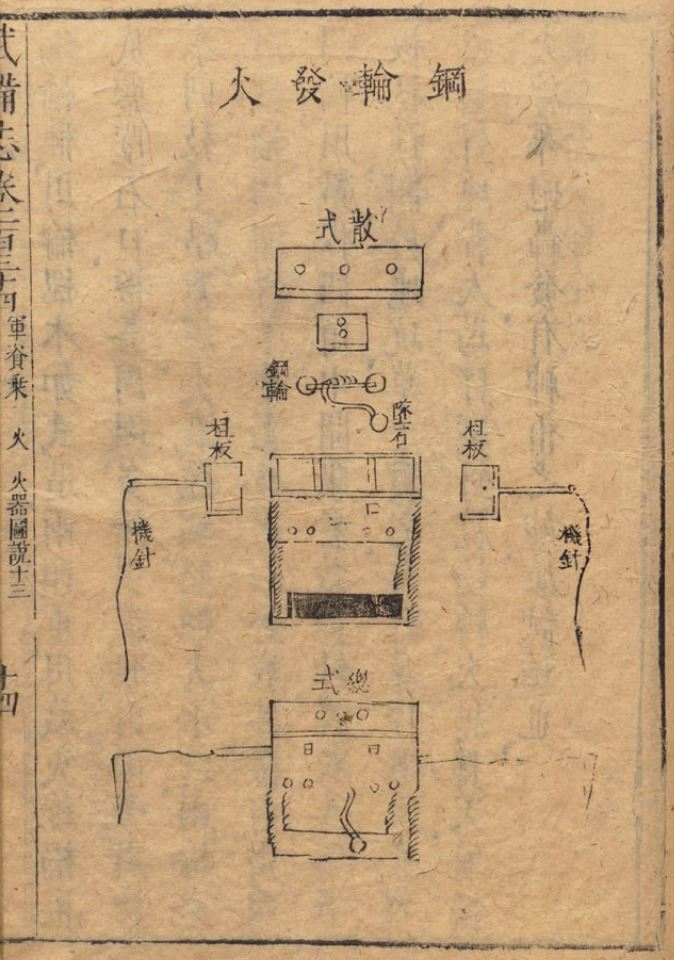

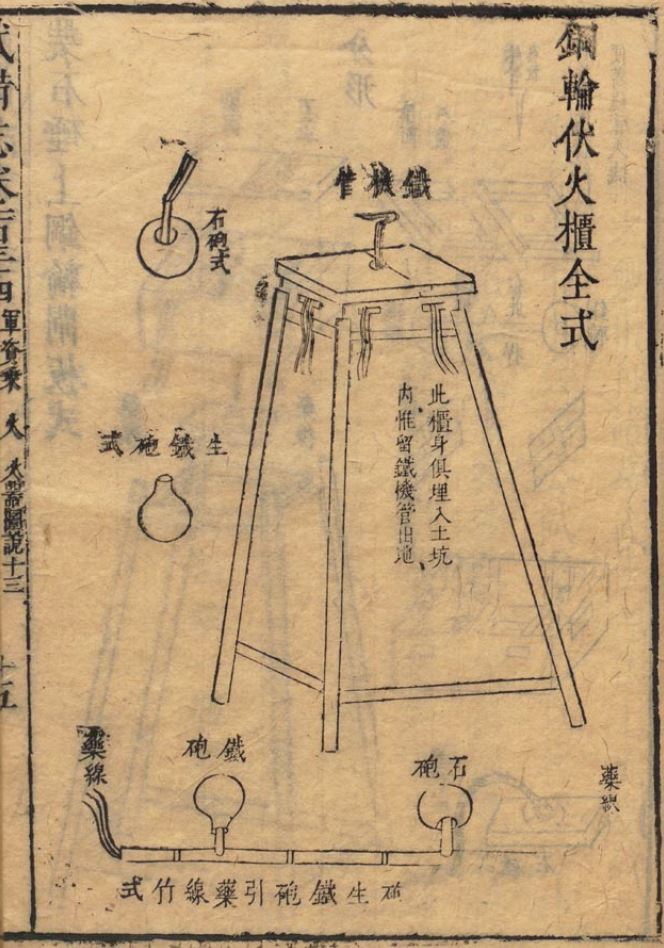

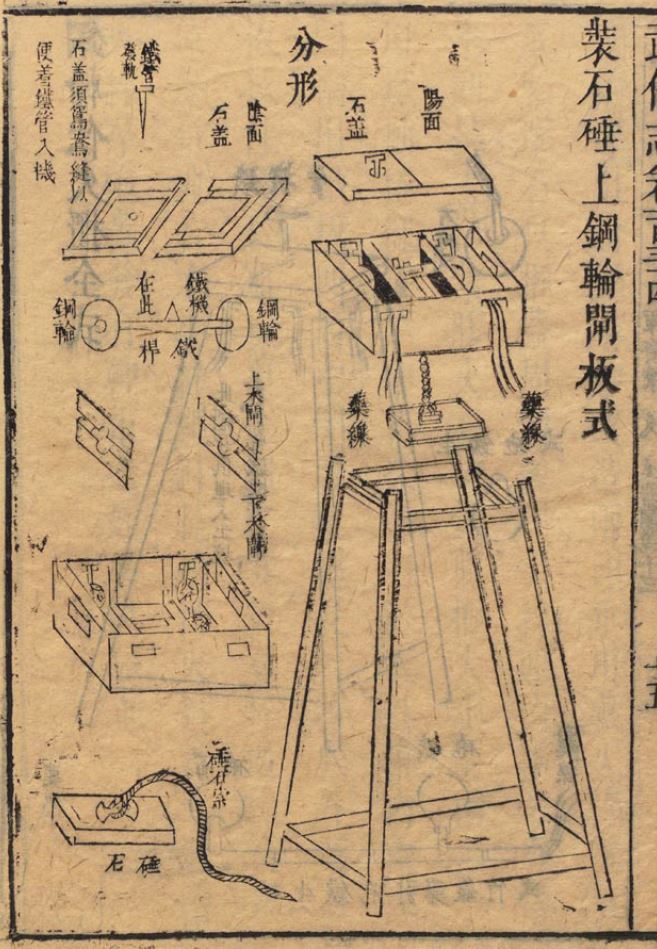

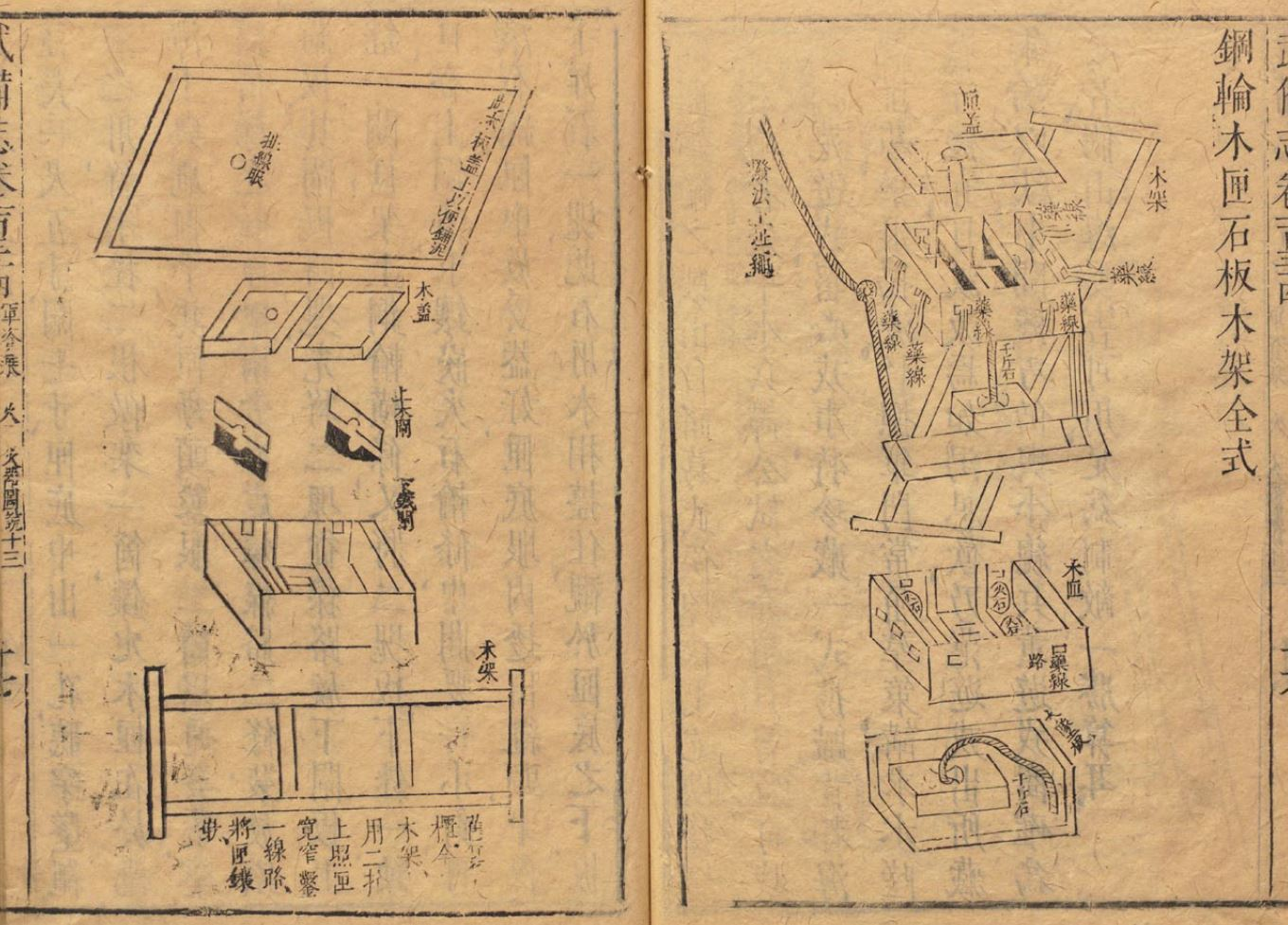

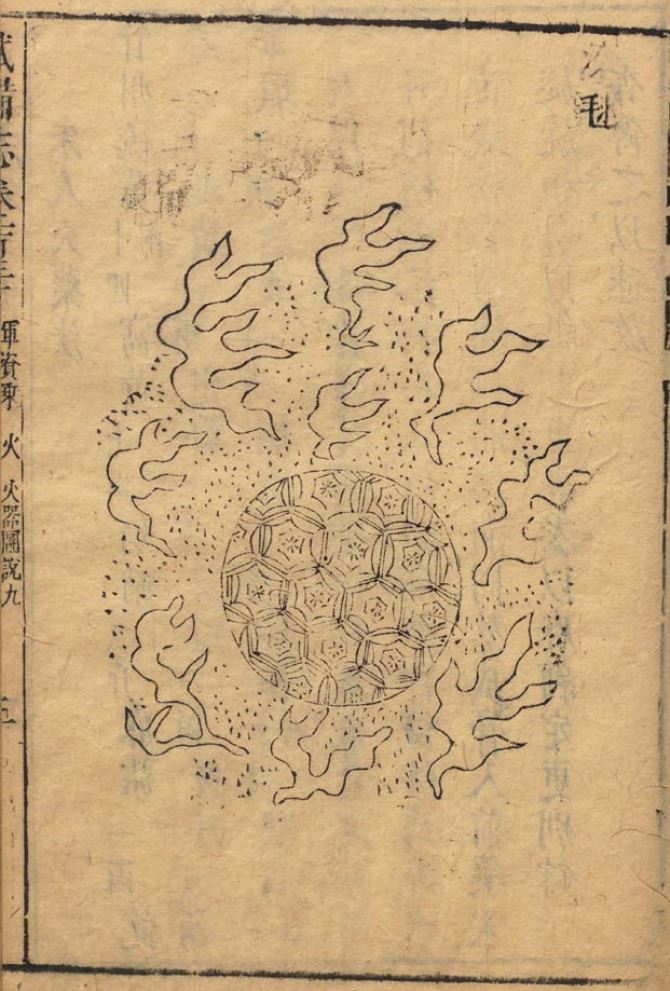

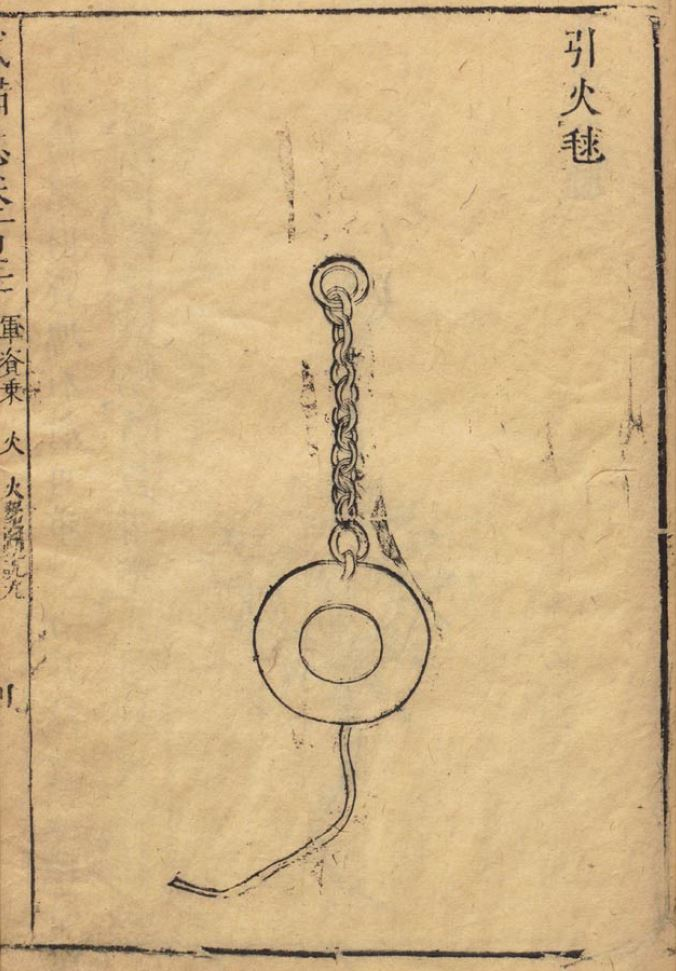

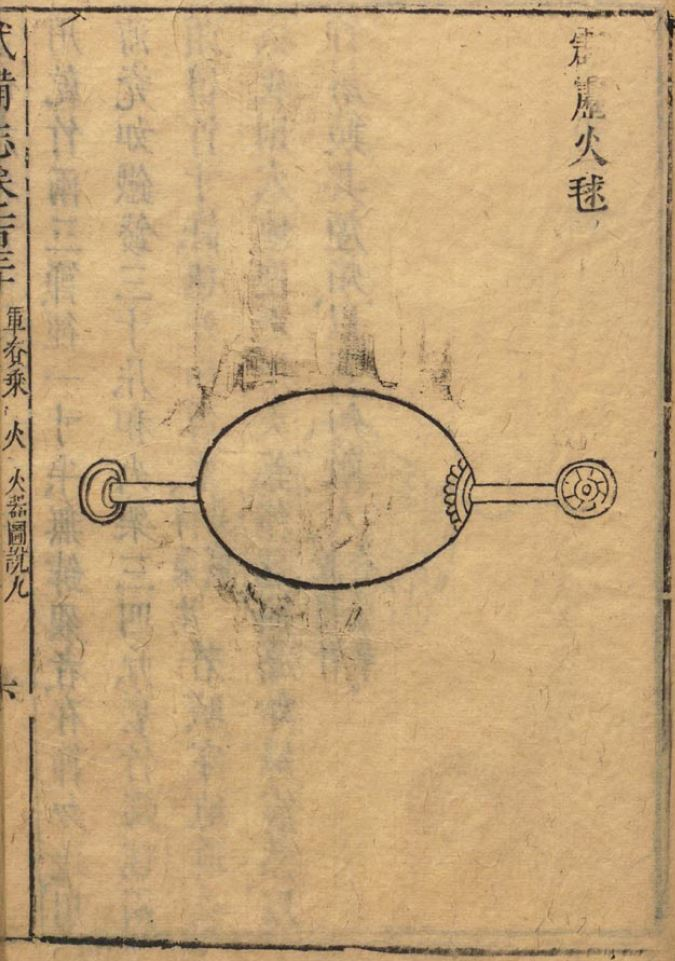

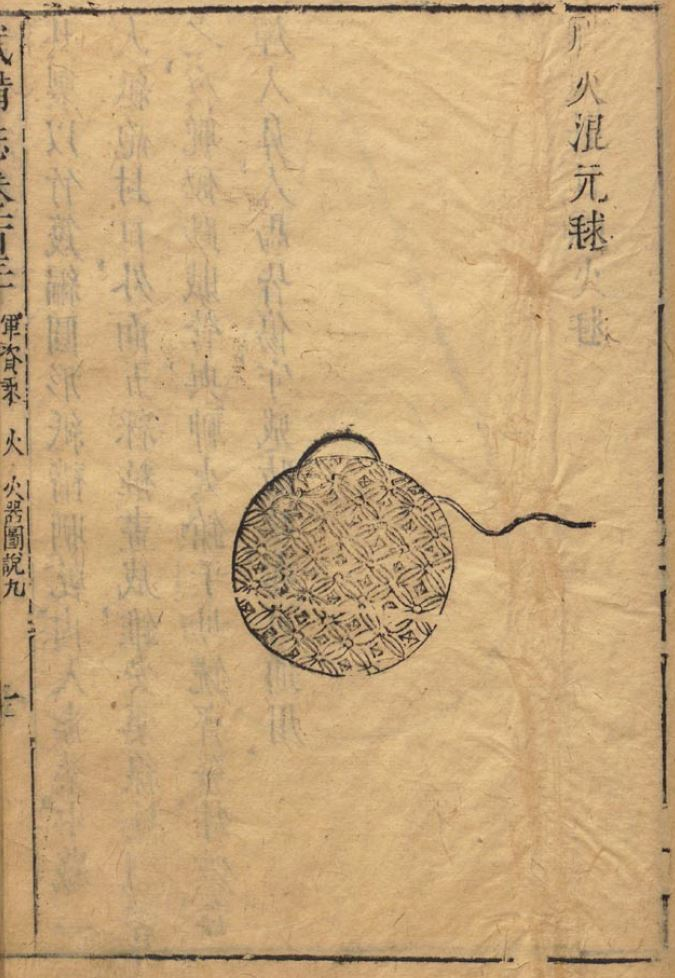

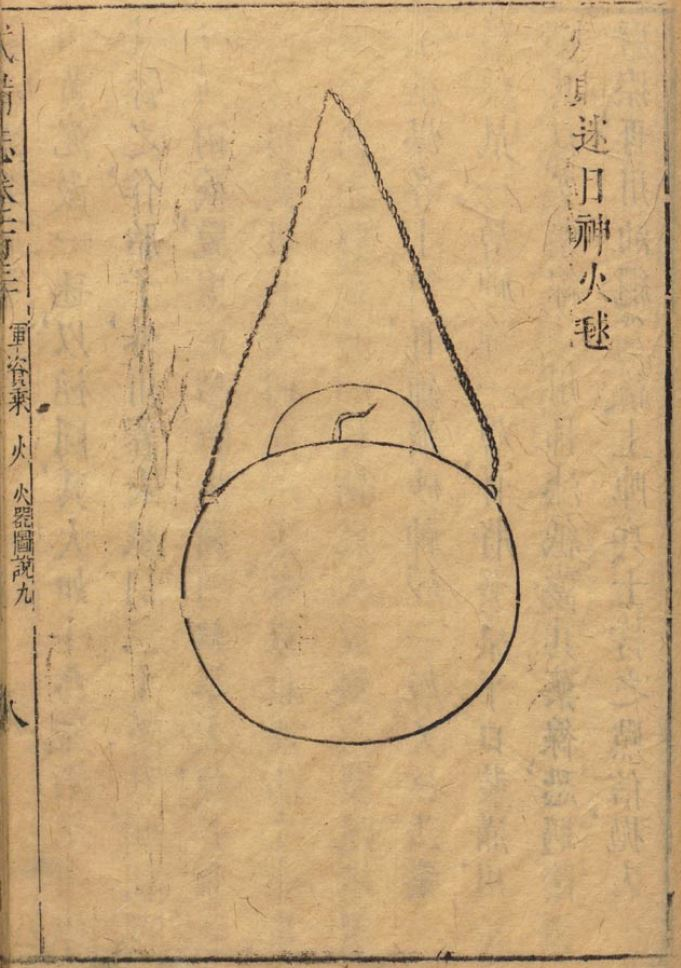

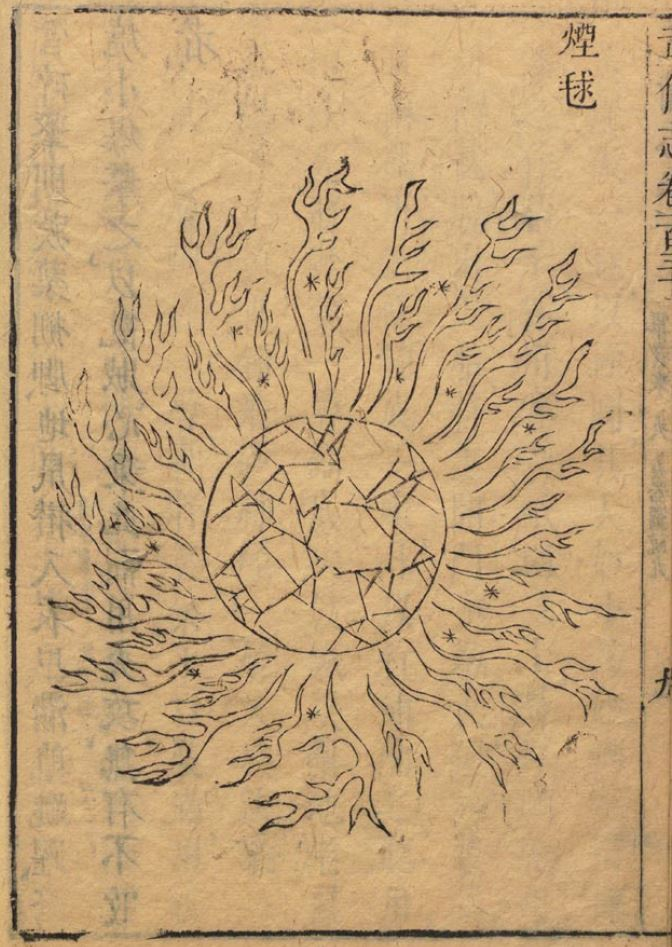

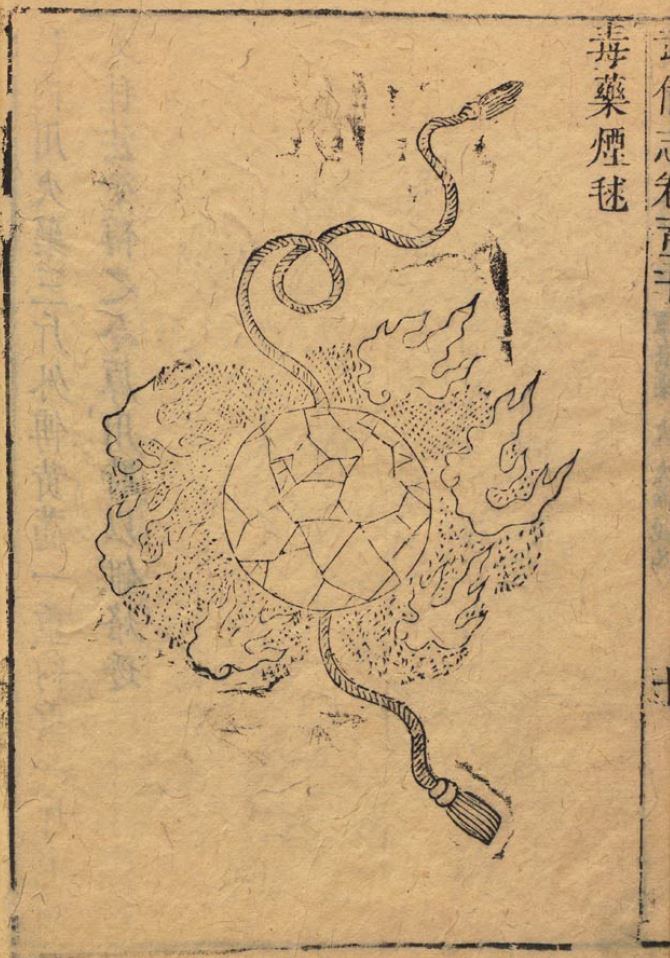

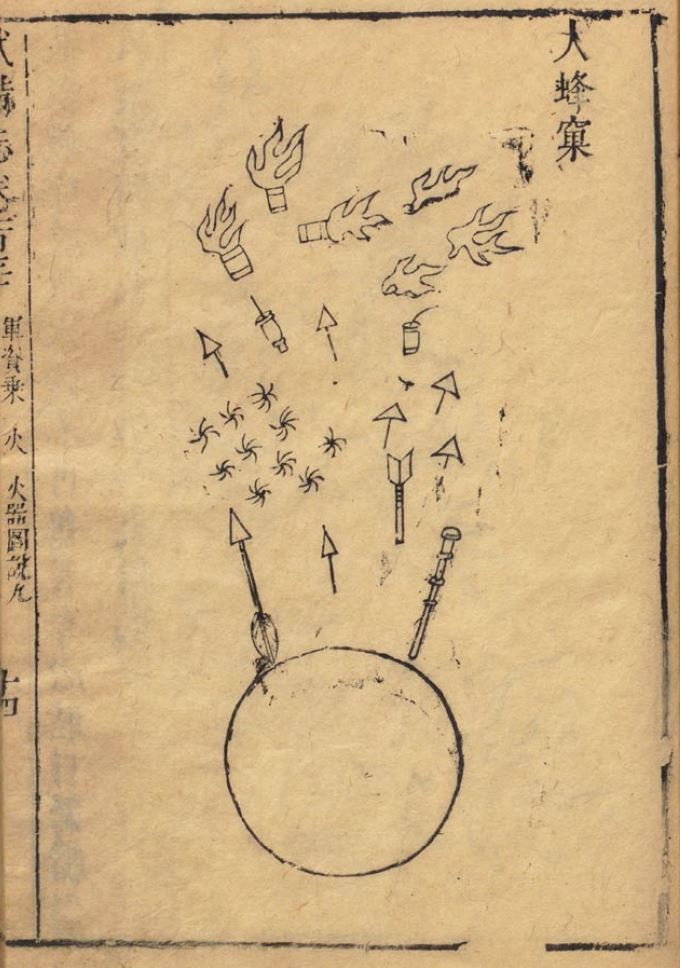

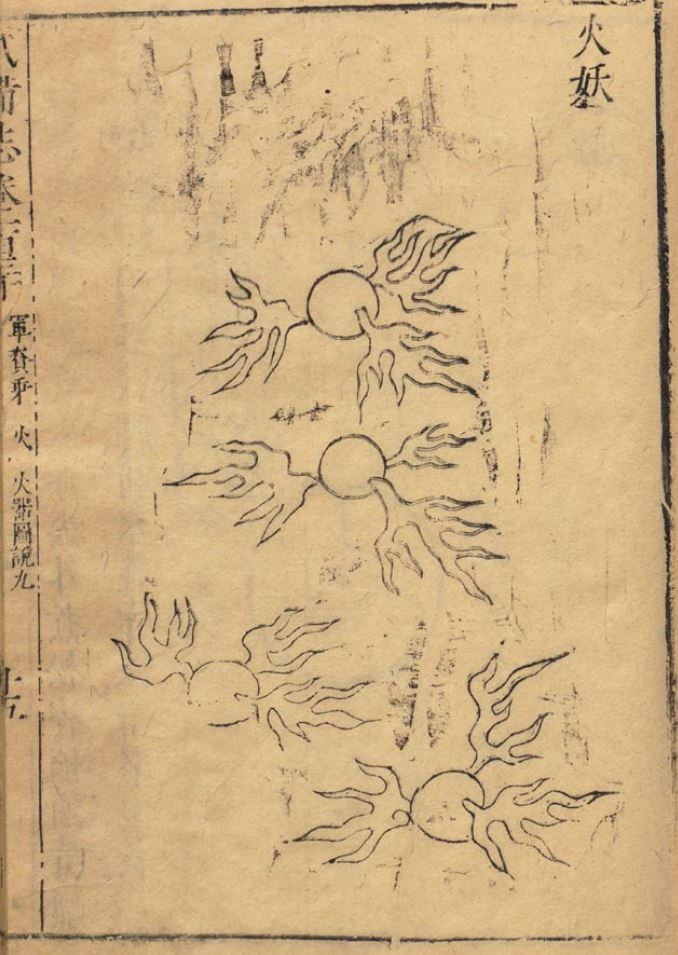

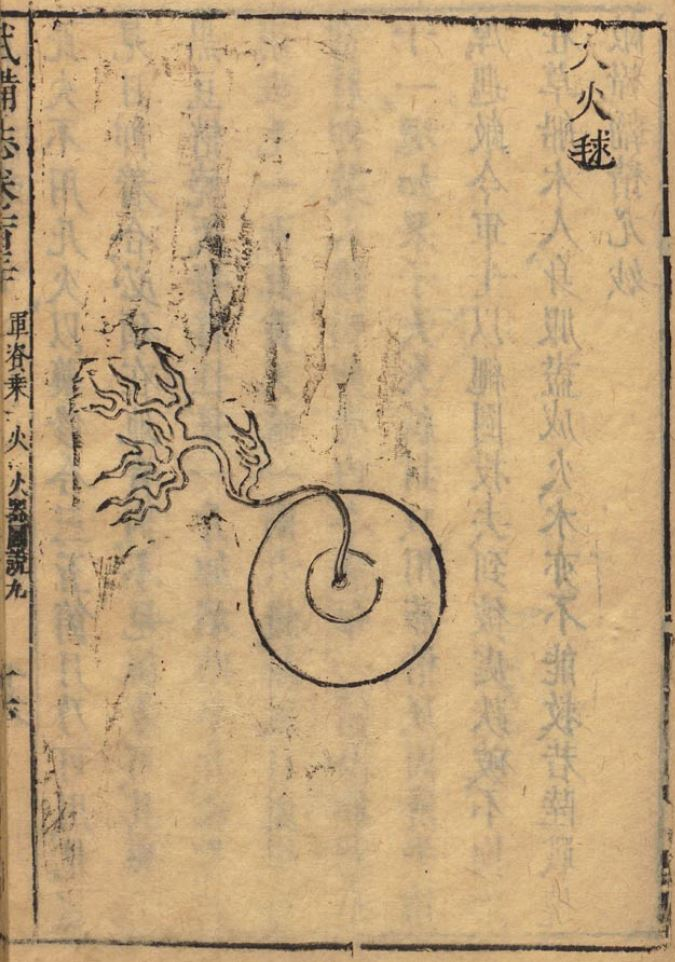

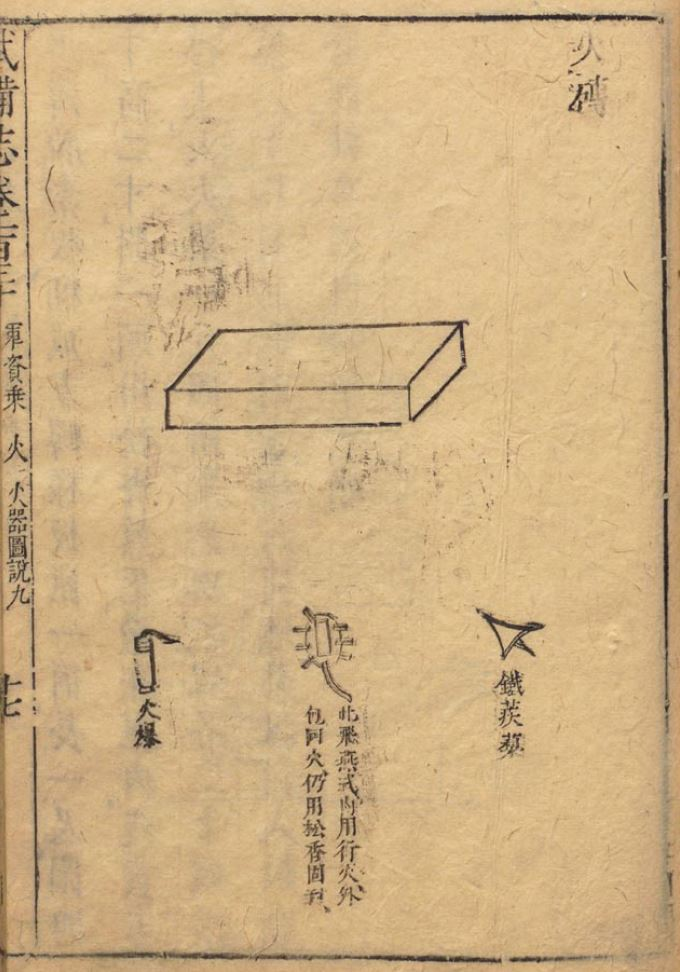

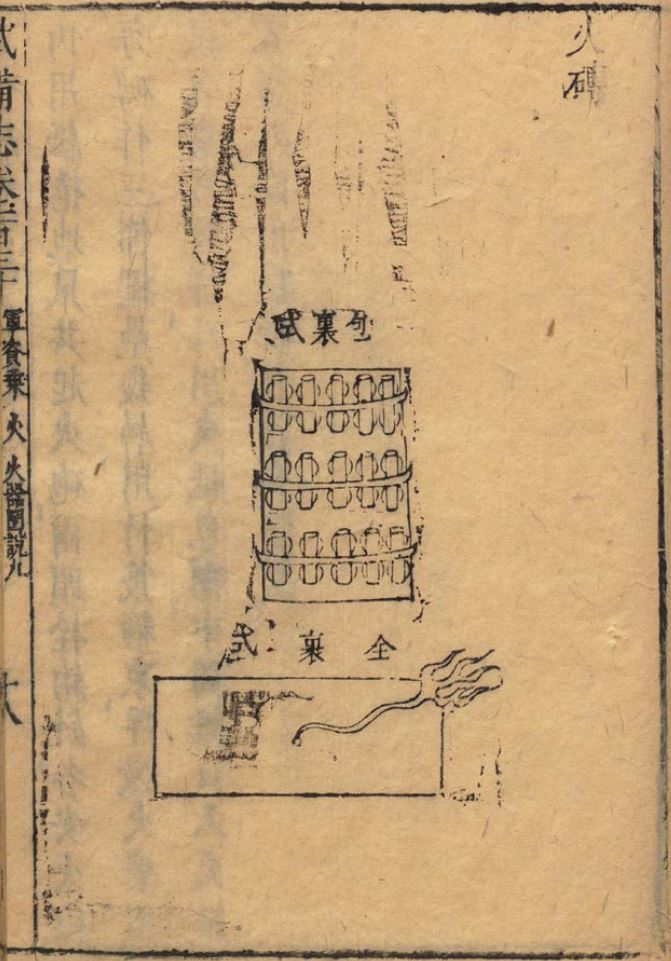

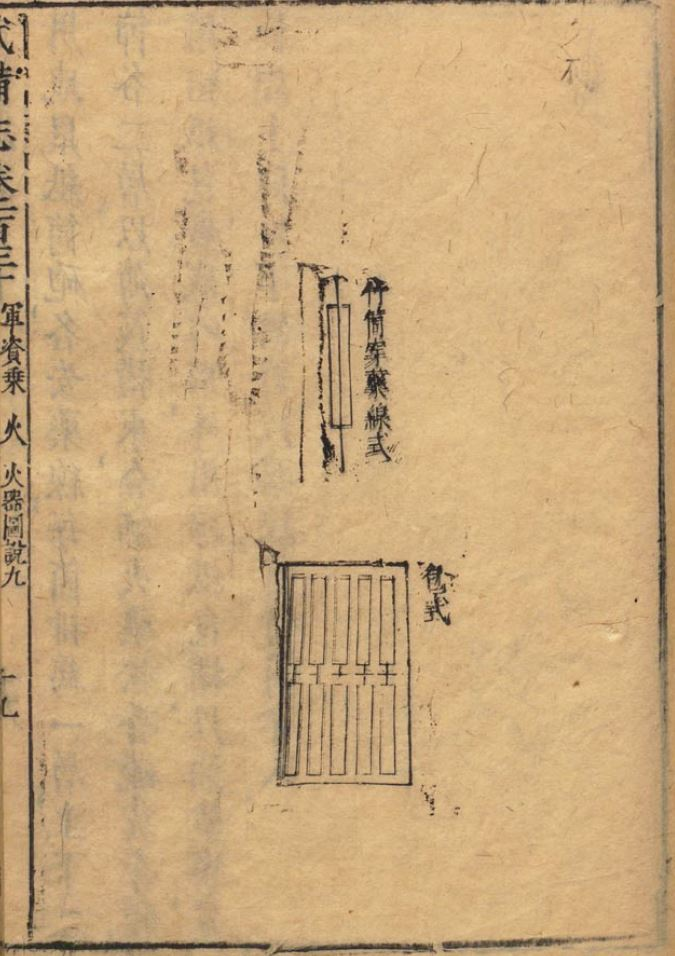

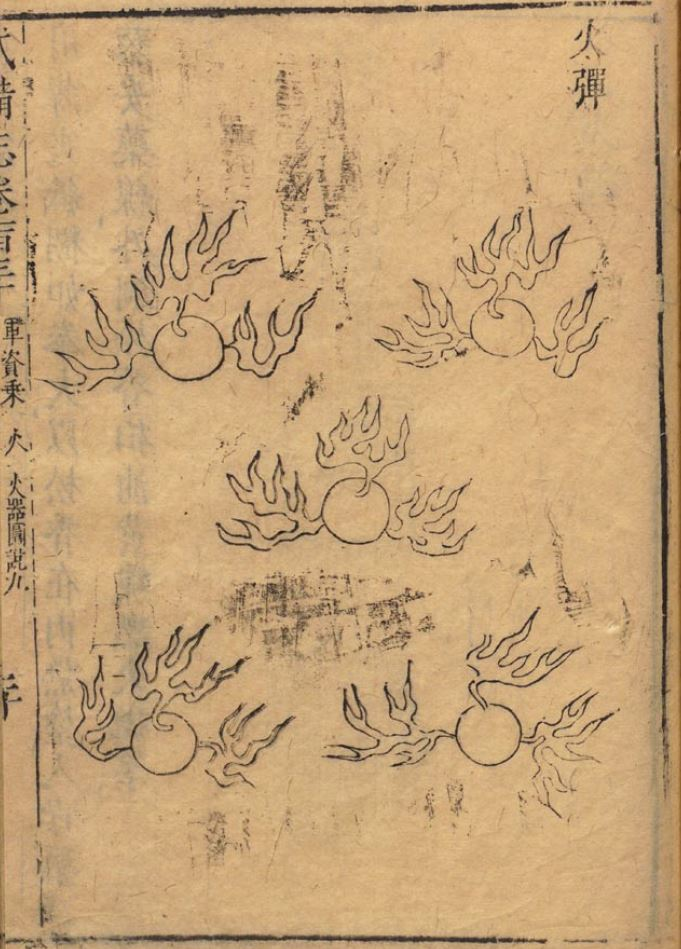

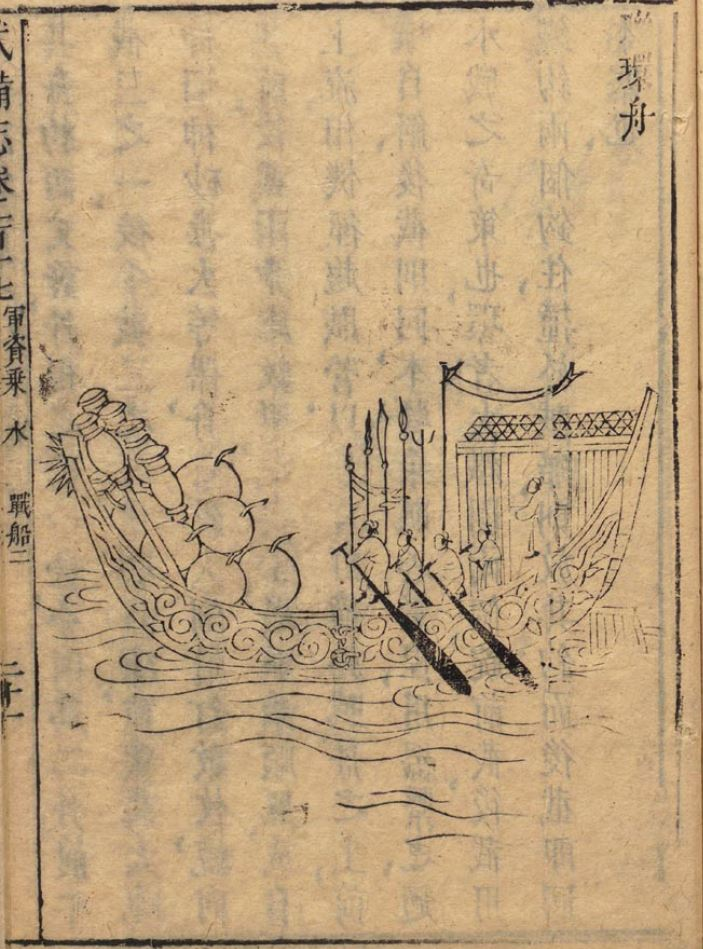

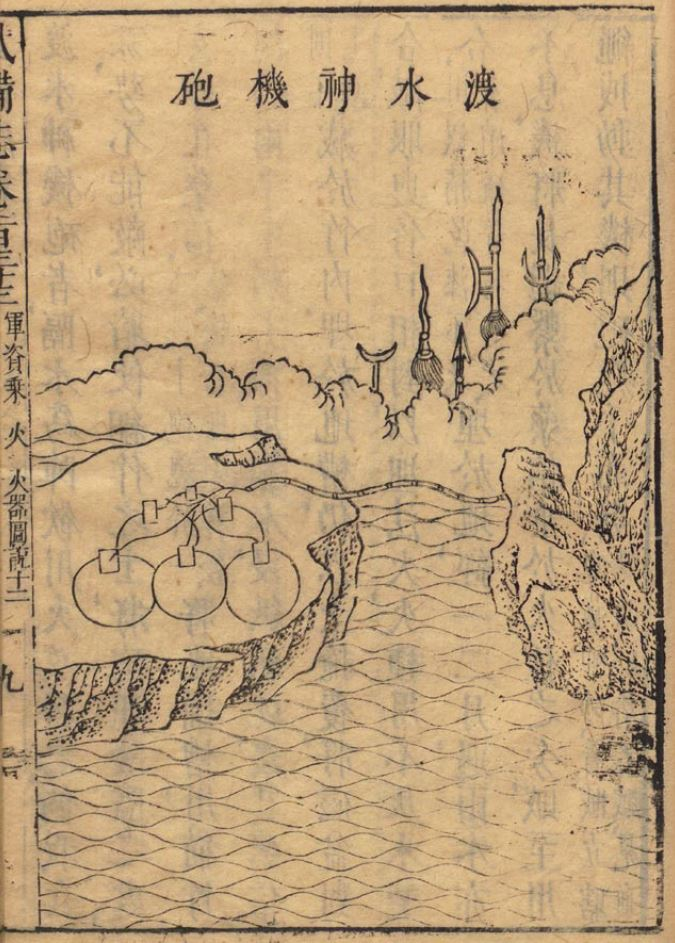

=== Animals ===
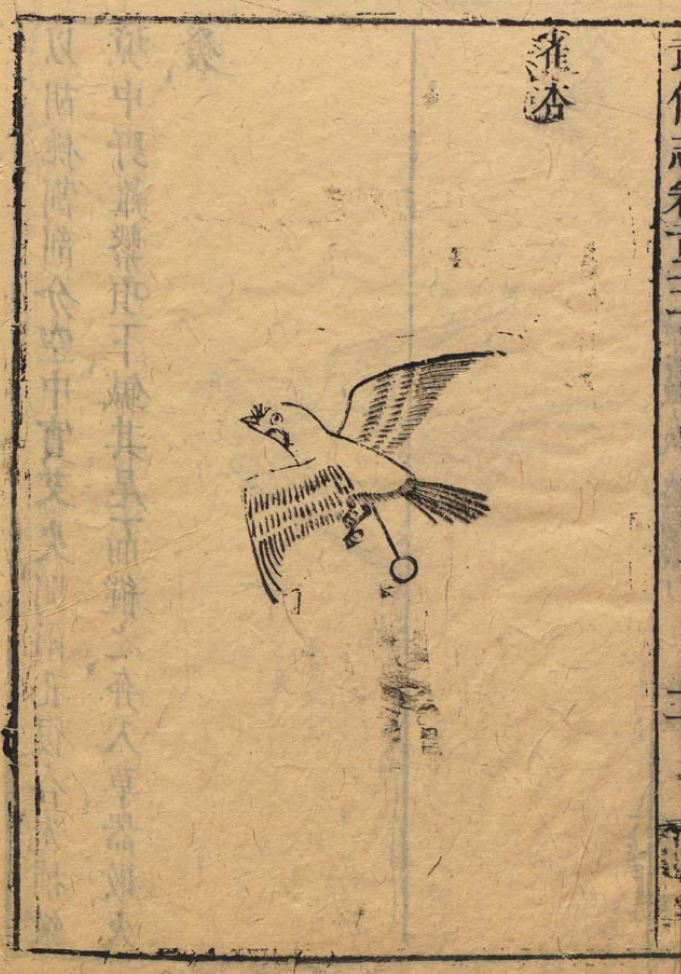

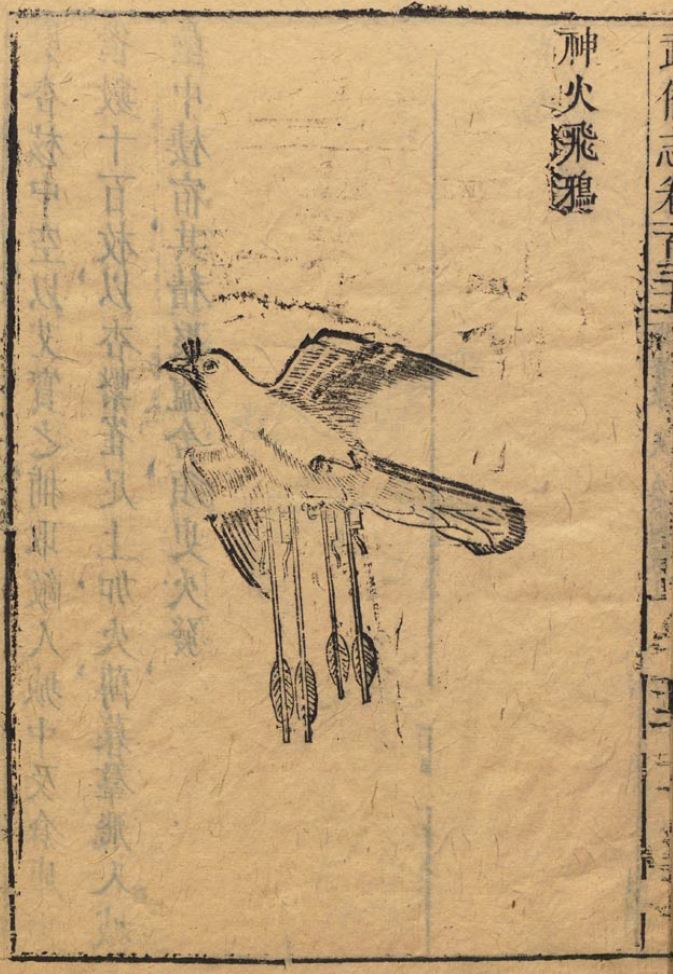

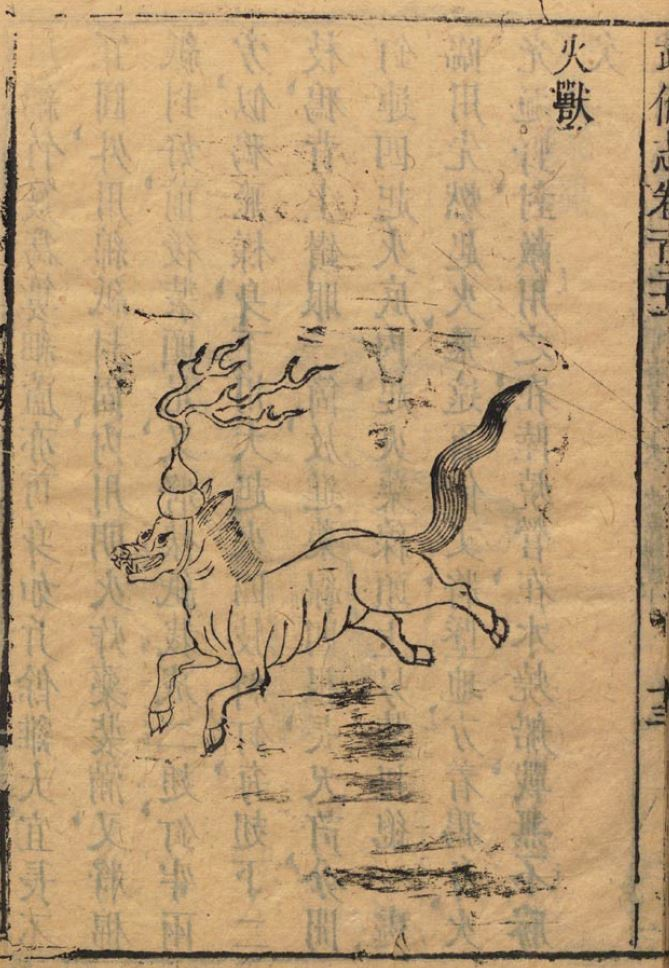

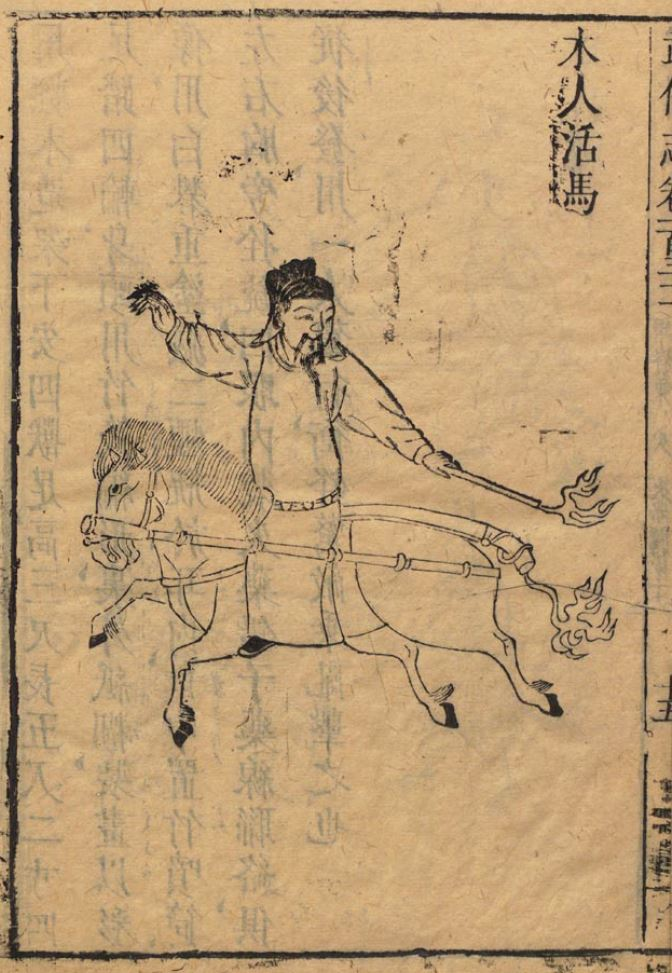

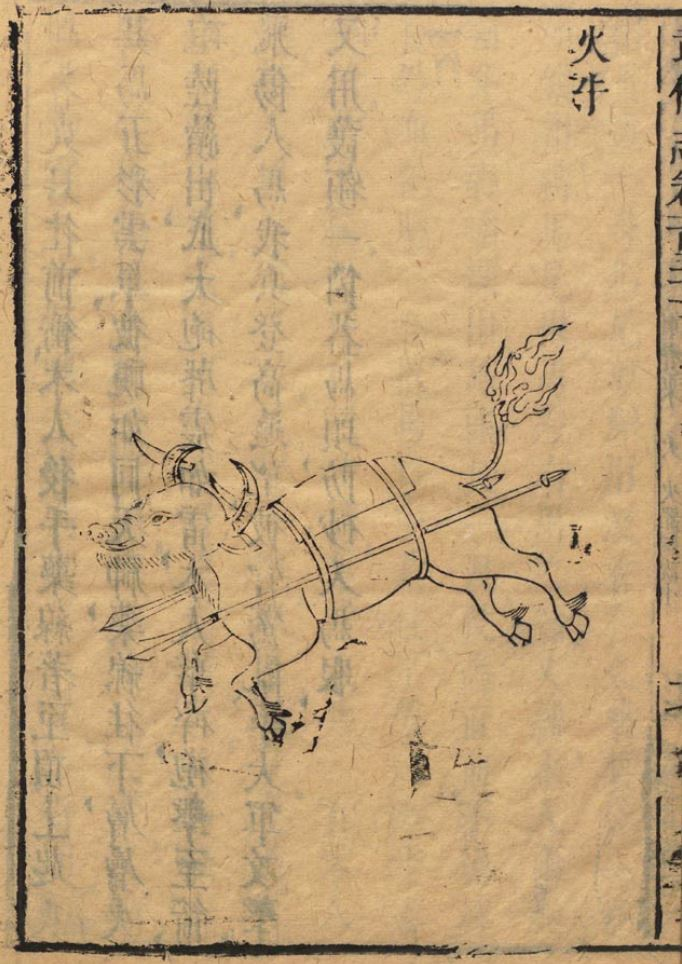

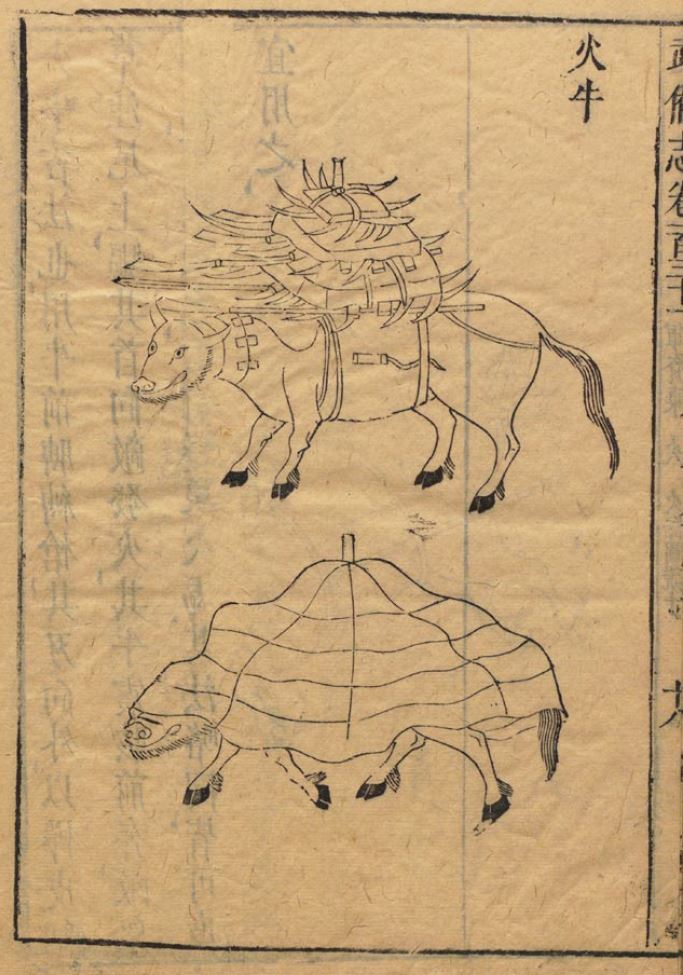

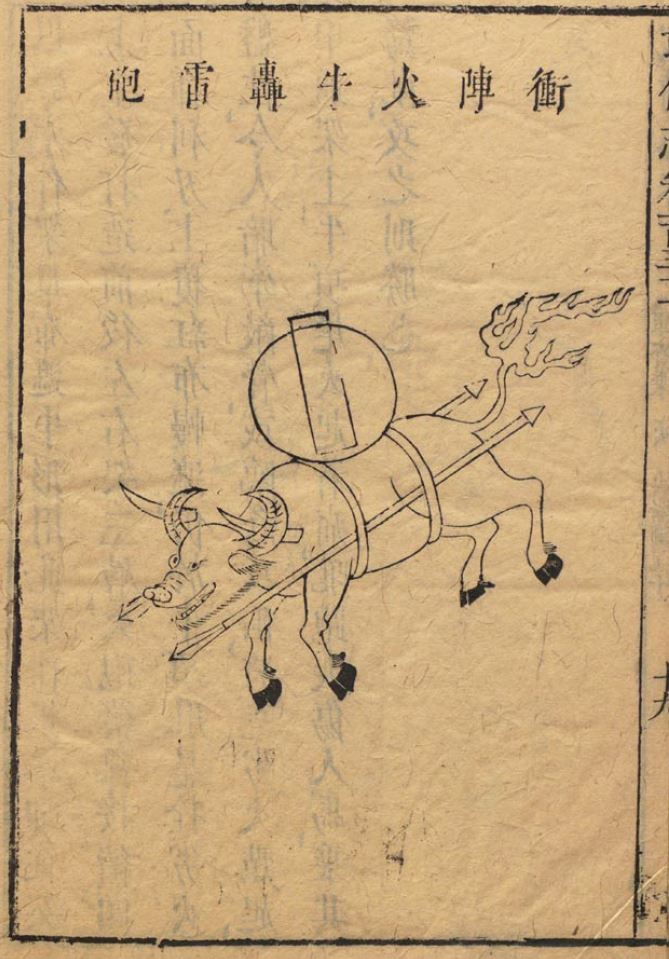

== See also ==
- Wujing Zongyao, Chinese military compendium written from around 1040 to 1044.
- Huolongjing, mid-14th-century Chinese military treatise.
- Jixiao Xinshu, Chinese military manual written during the 1560s and 1580s.
