= Green mix =

Green mix is an early step in the manufacturing of black powder for explosives. It is a rough mixture of potassium nitrate, charcoal and sulfur in the correct proportions (75:15:10) for black powder, but is not milled, pressed or corned. It burns much more slowly than black powder, when it chooses to burn at all, can still explode if ignited in a confined place; the deflagration is usually characterized by short, uneven sizzling followed by relatively long periods of smoulder.

== Usage ==
Green mix is merely an unfinished product and not generally used itself in any pyrotechnic or projectile applications.

== See also ==
- Meal powder
