= Zhenyuan Miaodao Yaolue =

Taoist alchemy text

The Zhenyuan Miaodao Yaolue (真元妙道要略, lit. Essentials of the Mysterious Way of the True Origin) is a Taoist alchemy text that dates to c. 950. It contains one of the earliest known references to gunpowder.

== Dating and authorship ==
The text is attributed to Zheng Yin, an alchemist from the 3rd century who purportedly taught Ge Hong, but the bulk of the text appears to have been written during the 9th century.

== Contents ==
The document compiles thirty-four recipes of elixirs that potentially could cause harm. Of these, three recipes mention saltpeter as an ingredient. A warning is given regarding a particularly dangerous combination of materials:

Some have heated together sulphur, realgar, saltpeter with honey; smoke (and flames) result, so that their hands and faces have been burnt, and even the whole house burned down.

The ingredients would have produced a weak form of gunpowder—a mixture of sulphur, saltpeter, and carbon—with honey acting as the source of carbon.
