= Gunpowder =

Type of firearm propellant

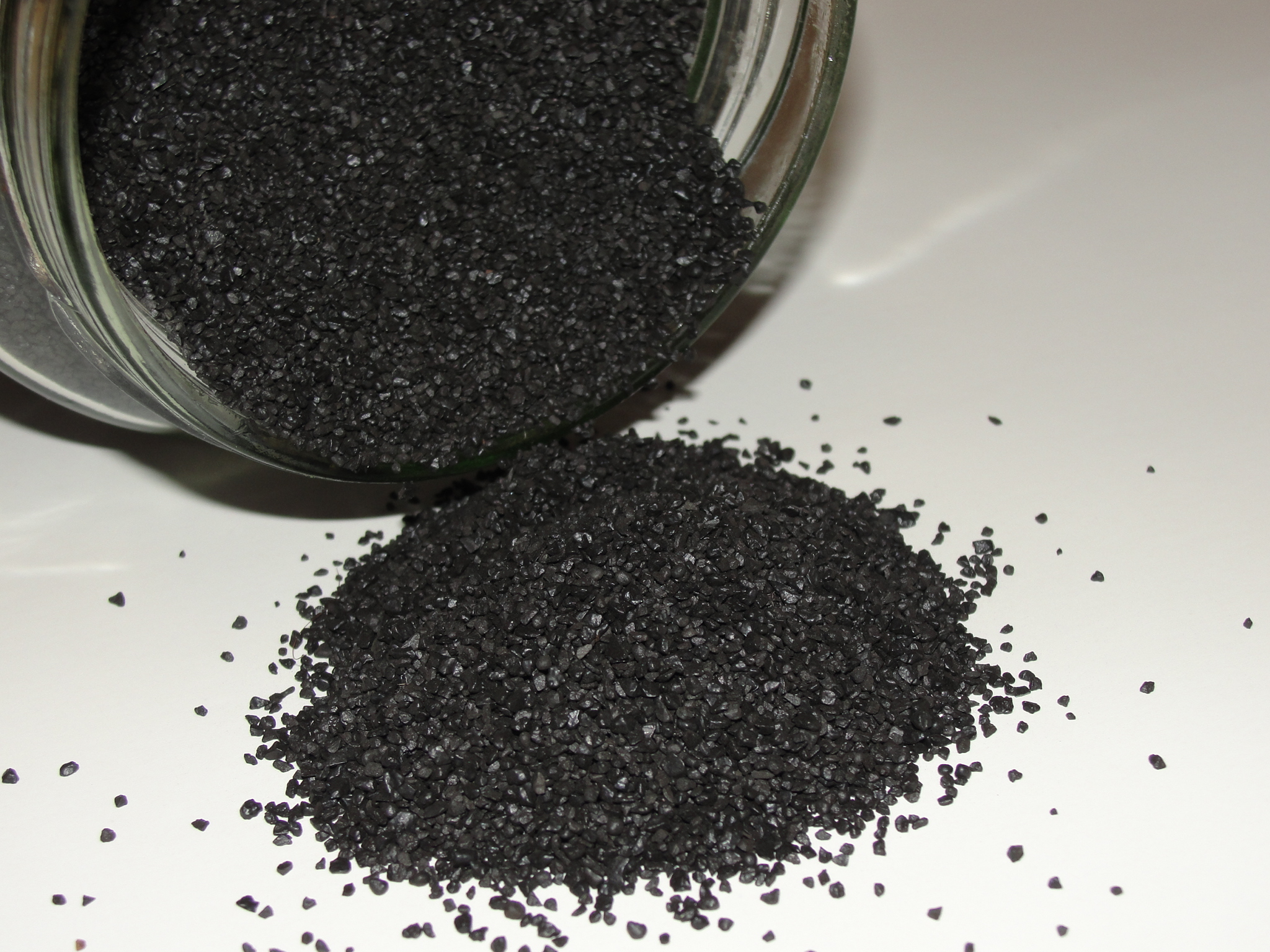
Gunpowder for muzzleloading firearms in granulation size

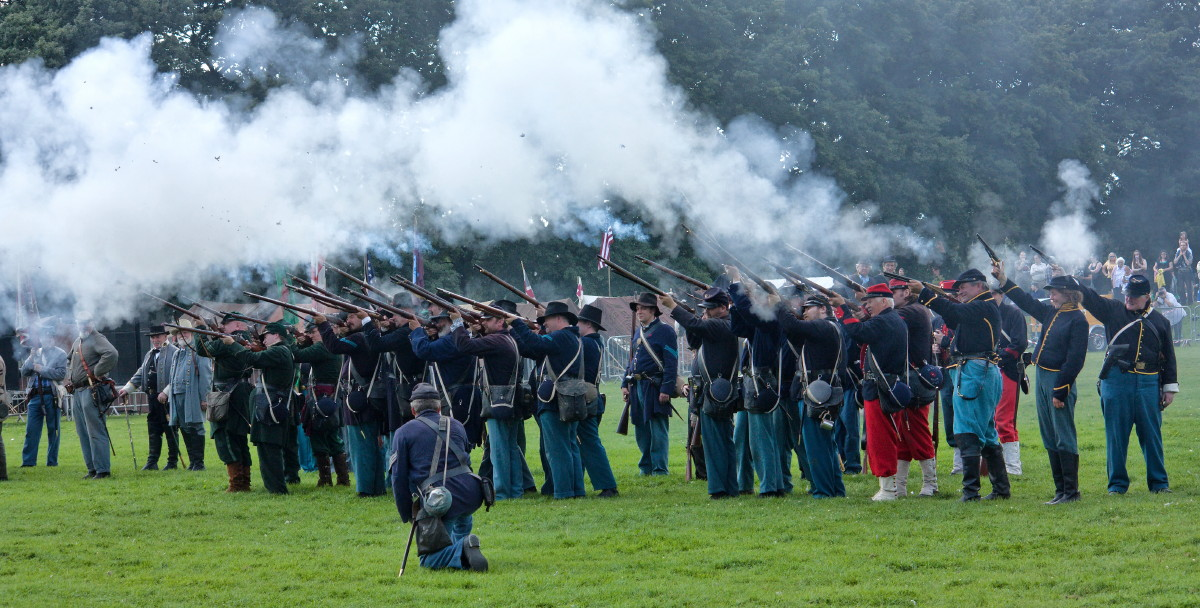
American Civil War re-enactors volley firing with black powder

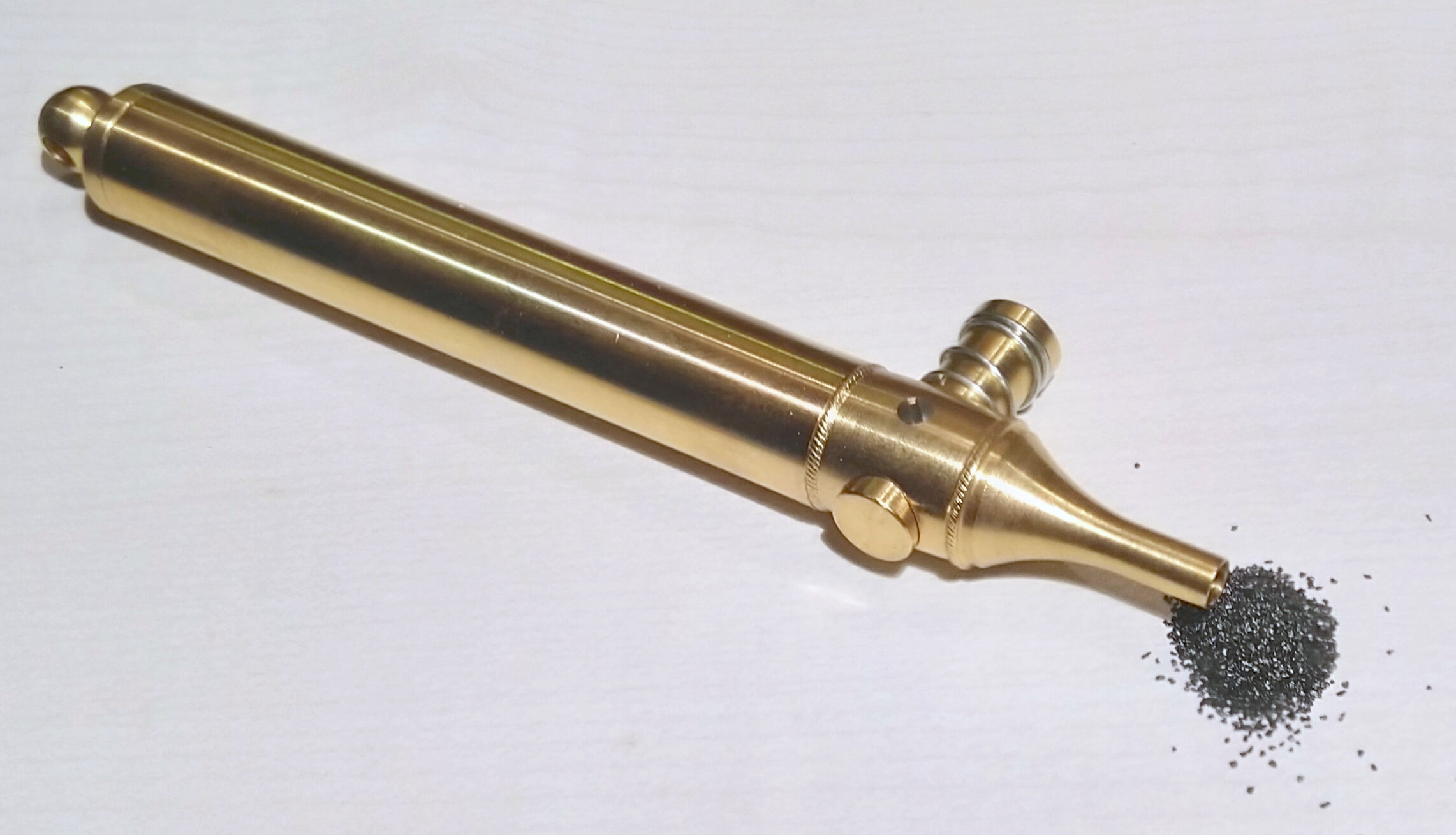
Flash pan starter dispenser

Gunpowder, referred to as black powder to distinguish it from modern smokeless powder, is the earliest known chemical explosive. It consists of a mixture of sulfur, charcoal (which is mostly carbon), and potassium nitrate (saltpeter). The sulfur and charcoal act as fuels, while the saltpeter is an oxidizer. Gunpowder has been widely used as a propellant in firearms, artillery, rocketry, and pyrotechnics, including use as a blasting agent for explosives in quarrying, mining, building pipelines, tunnels, and roads.

Gunpowder is classified as a low explosive because of its relatively slow decomposition rate, low ignition temperature and consequently low brisance (breaking/shattering). Low explosives deflagrate—burning at subsonic speeds—whereas high explosives detonate, producing a supersonic shockwave. Ignition of gunpowder packed behind a projectile generates enough pressure to force the shot from the muzzle at high speed, but usually not enough force to rupture the gun barrel. It thus makes a good propellant but is less suitable for shattering rock or fortifications with its low-yield explosive power. Nonetheless, it was widely used to fill fused artillery shells (and used in mining and civil engineering projects) until the second half of the 19th century, when the first high explosives were put into use.

Gunpowder is one of the Four Great Inventions of China. Originally developed by Taoists for medicinal purposes, it was first used for warfare around AD 904. Its use in weapons has declined due to smokeless powder replacing it, whilst its relative inefficiency led to newer alternatives such as dynamite and ammonium nitrate/fuel oil replacing it in industrial applications.

== Effect ==
Gunpowder is a low explosive: it does not detonate, but rather deflagrates (burns quickly). This is an advantage in a propellant device, where one does not desire a shock that would shatter the gun and potentially harm the operator; however, it is a drawback when an explosion is desired. In that case, the propellant (and most importantly, gases produced by its burning) must be confined. Since it contains its own oxidizer and additionally burns faster under pressure, its combustion is capable of bursting containers such as a shell, grenade, or improvised "pipe bomb" or "pressure cooker" casings to form shrapnel.

In quarrying, high explosives are generally preferred for shattering rock. However, because of its low brisance, gunpowder causes fewer fractures and results in more usable stone compared to other explosives, making it useful for blasting slate, which is fragile, or monumental stone such as granite and marble. Gunpowder is well suited for blank rounds, signal flares, burst charges, and rescue-line launches. It is also used in fireworks for lifting shells, in rockets as fuel, and in certain special effects.

Combustion converts less than half the mass of gunpowder to gas; most of it turns into particulate matter. Some of it is ejected, wasting propelling power, fouling the air, and generally being a nuisance (giving away a soldier's position, generating fog that hinders vision, etc.). Some of it ends up as a thick layer of soot inside the barrel, where it also is a nuisance for subsequent shots, and a cause of jamming an automatic weapon. Moreover, this residue contains potassium oxide or sodium oxide, which is hygroscopic and forms potassium hydroxide or sodium hydroxide upon absorbing moisture from the air, causing wrought iron or steel gun barrels to corrode. Gunpowder arms therefore require thorough and regular cleaning to remove the residue.

Gunpowder loads can be used in modern firearms as long as they are not gas-operated. (Note: Loading black powder cartridges into most gas-operated firearms causes failure to cycle. However, some gas-operated guns that use cartridges such as .45 ACP, 9×19mm, and even 7.62×39mm can cycle somewhat properly depending on the firearm model, cartridge specifications, and powder loads (albeit with heavy fouling).) The most compatible modern guns are smoothbore-barreled shotguns that are long-recoil operated with chrome-plated essential parts such as barrels and bores. Such guns have minimal fouling and corrosion, and are easier to clean.

== History ==
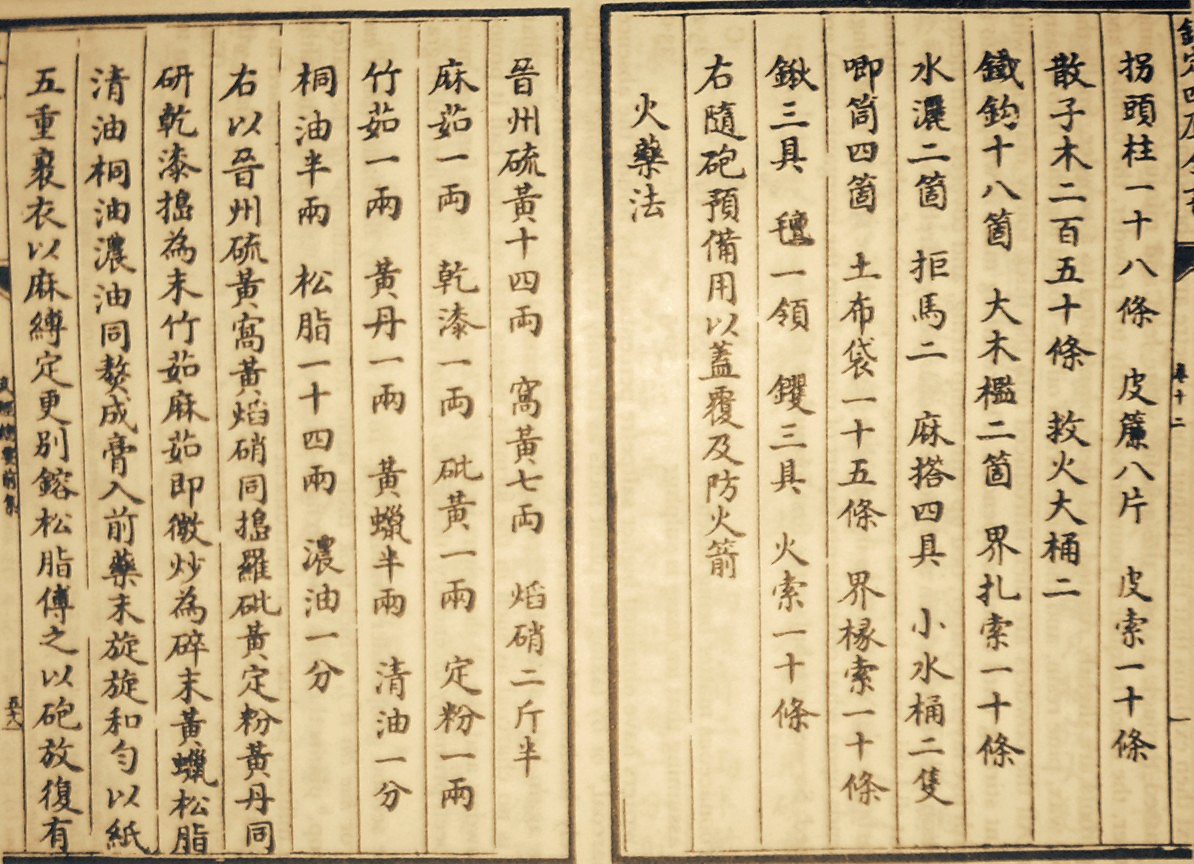
Earliest known written formula for gunpowder, from the Wujing Zongyao of 1044 AD.

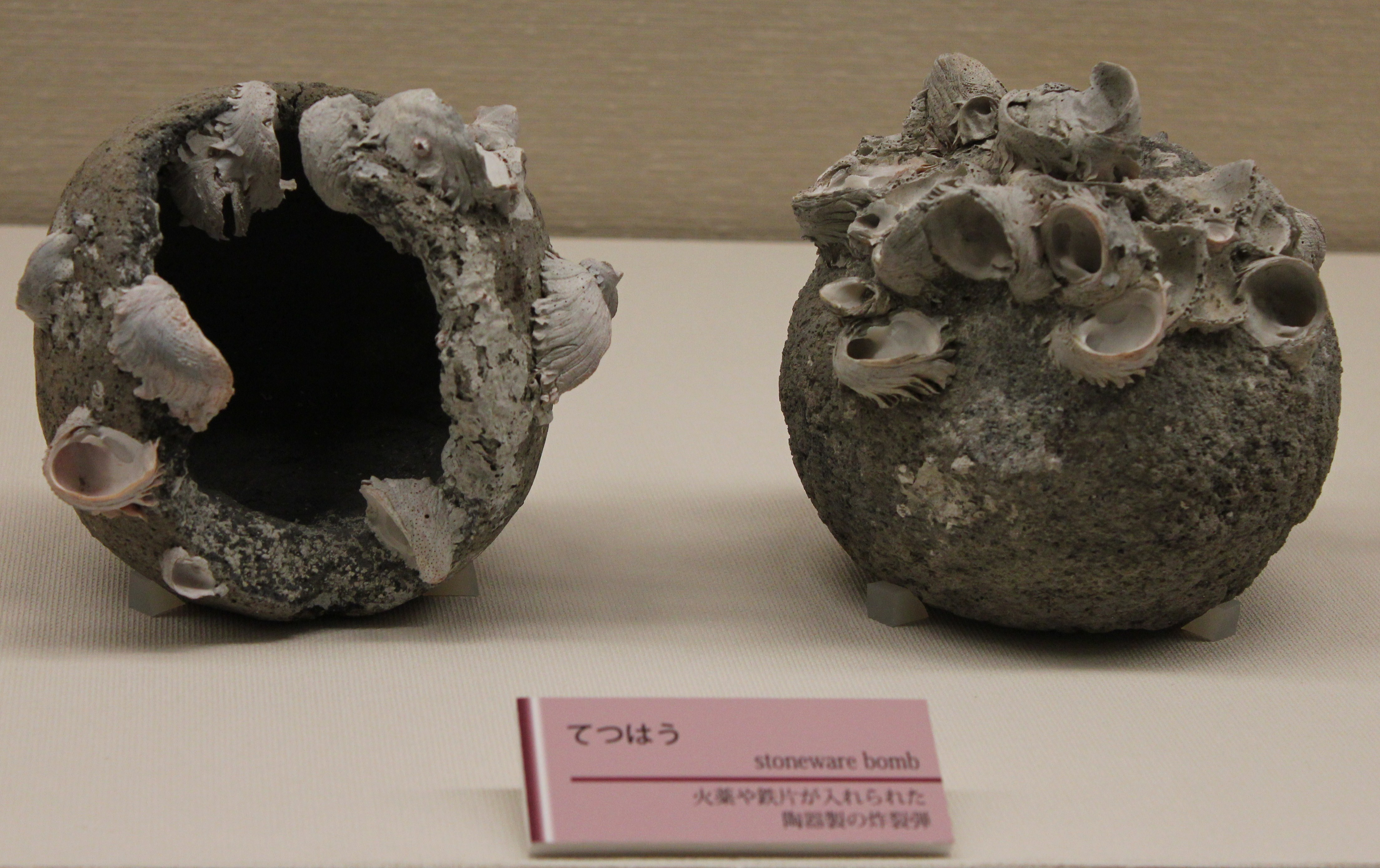
Stoneware bombs, known in Japanese as Tetsuhau (iron bomb), or in Chinese as Zhentianlei (thunder crash bomb), excavated from the Takashima shipwreck, October 2011, dated to the Mongol invasions of Japan (1274–1281 AD)

=== China ===
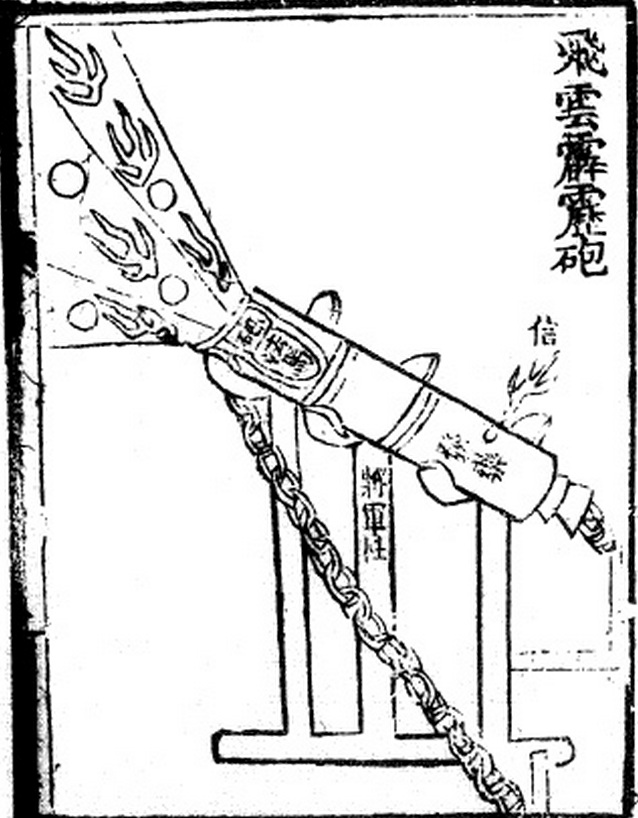
A 'flying-cloud thunderclap-eruptor' firing thunderclap bombs from the Huolongjing

The first confirmed reference to what can be considered gunpowder in China occurred in the 9th century during the Tang dynasty, first in a formula contained in the Taishang Shengzu Jindan Mijue (Chinese: 太上聖祖金丹秘訣) in 808, and then about 50 years later in a Daoist text known as the Zhenyuan miaodao yaolüe (真元妙道要略). The Taishang Shengzu Jindan Mijue mentions a formula composed of six parts sulfur to six parts saltpeter to one part birthwort herb. According to the Zhenyuan miaodao yaolüe, "Some have heated together sulfur, realgar and saltpeter with honey; smoke and flames result, so that their hands and faces have been burnt, and even the whole house where they were working burned down." Based on these Taoist texts, the invention of gunpowder by Chinese alchemists was likely an accidental byproduct from experiments seeking to create the elixir of life. This experimental medicine origin is reflected in its Chinese name huoyao (Chinese: 火药/火藥; pinyin: huǒ yào/xuo jɑʊ/), which means "fire medicine". Saltpeter was known to the Chinese by the mid-1st century AD and was primarily produced in the provinces of Sichuan, Shanxi, and Shandong. There is strong evidence of the use of saltpeter and sulfur in various medicinal combinations. A Chinese alchemical text dated 492 noted saltpeter burnt with a purple flame, providing a practical and reliable means of distinguishing it from other inorganic salts, thus enabling alchemists to evaluate and compare purification techniques; the earliest Latin accounts of saltpeter purification are dated after 1200.

The earliest chemical formula for gunpowder appeared in the 11th-century Song dynasty text Wujing Zongyao (Complete Essentials from the Military Classics), written by Zeng Gongliang between 1040 and 1044. The Wujing Zongyao provides encyclopedia references to a variety of mixtures that included petrochemicals—as well as garlic and honey. A slow match for flame-throwing mechanisms using the siphon principle and for fireworks and rockets is mentioned. The mixture formulas in this book contain at most 50% saltpeter — not enough to create an explosion, they produce an incendiary instead. The Essentials was written by a Song dynasty court bureaucrat and there is little evidence that it had any immediate impact on warfare; there is no mention of its use in the chronicles of the wars against the Tanguts in the 11th century, and China was otherwise mostly at peace during this century. However, it had already been used for fire arrows since at least the 10th century. Its first recorded military application dates its use to 904 in the form of incendiary projectiles. In the following centuries the Chinese recognised gunpowder for its military applications and gunpowder was weaponised in the form of bombs, fire lances and hand cannons in China. Explosive weapons such as bombs have been discovered in a shipwreck off the shore of Japan dated from 1281, during the Mongol invasions of Japan.

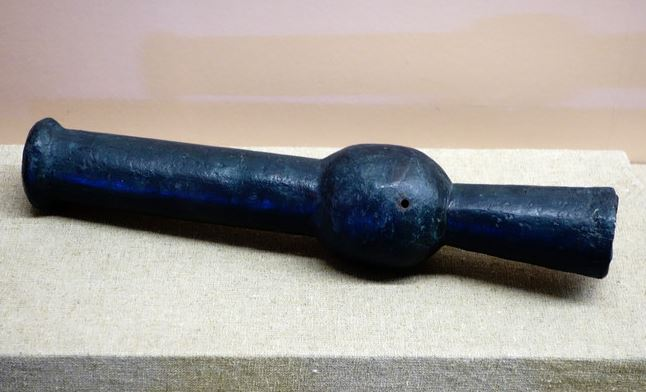
Heilongjiang Hand Cannon dated to 1288, an example of an early Chinese hand cannon that included a touch hole and a gunpowder chamber

By 1083 the Song court was producing hundreds of thousands of fire arrows for their garrisons. Bombs and the first proto-guns, known as "fire lances", became prominent during the 12th century and were used by the Song during the Jin–Song Wars. Fire lances were first recorded to have been used at the Siege of De'an in 1132 by Song forces against the Jin. In the early 13th century the Jin used iron-casing bombs. Projectiles were added to fire lances, and re-usable fire lance barrels were developed, first out of hardened paper, and then finally, the barrels were made out of metal to better withstand the explosive pressure of gunpowder. By 1257 some fire lances were firing wads of bullets. In the late 13th century metal fire lances became 'eruptors', proto-cannons firing co-viative projectiles (mixed with the propellant, rather than seated over it with a wad), and by 1287 at the latest, had become true guns, the hand cannon, which included a metal barrel, touch hole and gunpowder chamber.

=== Middle East ===
According to Iqtidar Alam Khan, the Mongols introduced gunpowder in their invasion of Persia and Mesopotamia. The Muslims acquired knowledge of gunpowder sometime between 1240 and 1280, by which point the Syrian Hasan al-Rammah had written recipes, instructions for the purification of saltpeter, and descriptions of gunpowder incendiaries. It is implied by al-Rammah's usage of "terms that suggested he derived his knowledge from Chinese sources" and his references to saltpeter as "Chinese snow" (Arabic: ثلج الصين thalj al-ṣīn), fireworks as "Chinese flowers", and rockets as "Chinese arrows", that knowledge of gunpowder arrived from China. However, because al-Rammah attributes his material to "his father and forefathers", Ahmad Y. al-Hassan argues that gunpowder became prevalent in Syria and Egypt by "the end of the twelfth century or the beginning of the thirteenth". In Persia saltpeter was known as "Chinese salt" (Persian: نمک چینی}, romanized: namak-i chīnī) or "salt from Chinese salt marshes" (نمک شوره چینی namak-i shūra-yi chīnī).

Hasan al-Rammah included 107 gunpowder recipes in The Book of Military Horsemanship and Ingenious War Devices (Arabic: الـفـروسـيـة و الـمـنـاصـب الـحـربـيـة, romanized: al-Furūsiyya wal-Manāsib al-Ḥarbiyya), 22 of which are for rockets. The median of 17 of these 22 compositions for rockets (75% nitrates, 9.06% sulphur, and 15.94% charcoal) are nearly identical to the modern reported ideal recipe of 75% potassium nitrate, 10% sulphur, and 15% charcoal. The text also mentions fuses, incendiary bombs, naphtha pots, fire lances, and an illustration and description of the earliest torpedo. The torpedo was called the "egg which moves itself and burns". Two iron sheets were fastened together and tightened using felt. The flattened, pear-shaped vessel was filled with gunpowder, metal filings, "good mixtures", two rods, and a large rocket for propulsion. Judging by the illustration, it was supposed to glide across the water. Fire lances were used in battles between the Muslims and Mongols in 1299 and 1303.

Al-Hassan claims that in the Battle of Ain Jalut of 1260, the Mamluk Sultanate used "the first cannon in history" against the Mongols, utilizing a formula with near-identical ideal composition ratios for explosive gunpowder. Other historians urge caution regarding claims of Islamic firearms use in the 1204–1324 period, as late medieval Arabic texts used the same word for gunpowder, naft, that they used for an earlier incendiary, naphtha.

The earliest surviving documentary evidence for cannons in the Islamic world is from an Arabic manuscript dated to the early 14th century. The author's name is uncertain but may have been Shams al-Din Muhammad, who died in 1350. Dating from around 1320–1350, the illustrations show gunpowder weapons such as gunpowder arrows, bombs, fire tubes, and fire lances or proto-guns. The manuscript describes a type of gunpowder weapon called a midfa which uses gunpowder to shoot projectiles out of a tube at the end of a stock. Some consider this a cannon, while others do not. The problem with identifying cannons in early 14th-century Arabic texts is the term midfa, which appears from 1342 to 1352 but cannot be proven to be true hand-guns or bombards. Contemporary accounts of a metal-barrel cannon in the Islamic world do not occur until 1365. Needham believes that in its original form the term midfa refers to the tube or cylinder of a naphtha projector (flamethrower). After the invention of gunpowder, it meant the tube of fire lances, and eventually it applied to the cylinder of hand-guns and cannons.

According to Paul E. J. Hammer, the Mamluk Sultanate certainly used cannons by 1342. According to J. Lavin, cannons were used by Moors at the siege of Algeciras in 1343. Shihab al-Din Abu al-Abbas al-Qalqashandi described a metal cannon firing an iron ball between 1365 and 1376.

The musket appeared in the Ottoman Empire by 1465. In 1598, Chinese writer Zhao Shizhen described Turkish muskets as being superior to European muskets. The Chinese military work Wubei Zhi (1621) later described Turkish muskets that used a rack and pinion mechanism, which was not known to have been used in European or Chinese firearms at the time.

The state-controlled manufacture of gunpowder by the Ottoman Empire through early supply chains to obtain nitre, sulphur and high-quality charcoal from oaks in Anatolia contributed significantly to its expansion between the 15th and 18th centuries. It was not until later in the 19th century that the systemic production of Turkish gunpowder was reduced considerably, coinciding with the decline of its military might.

=== Europe ===
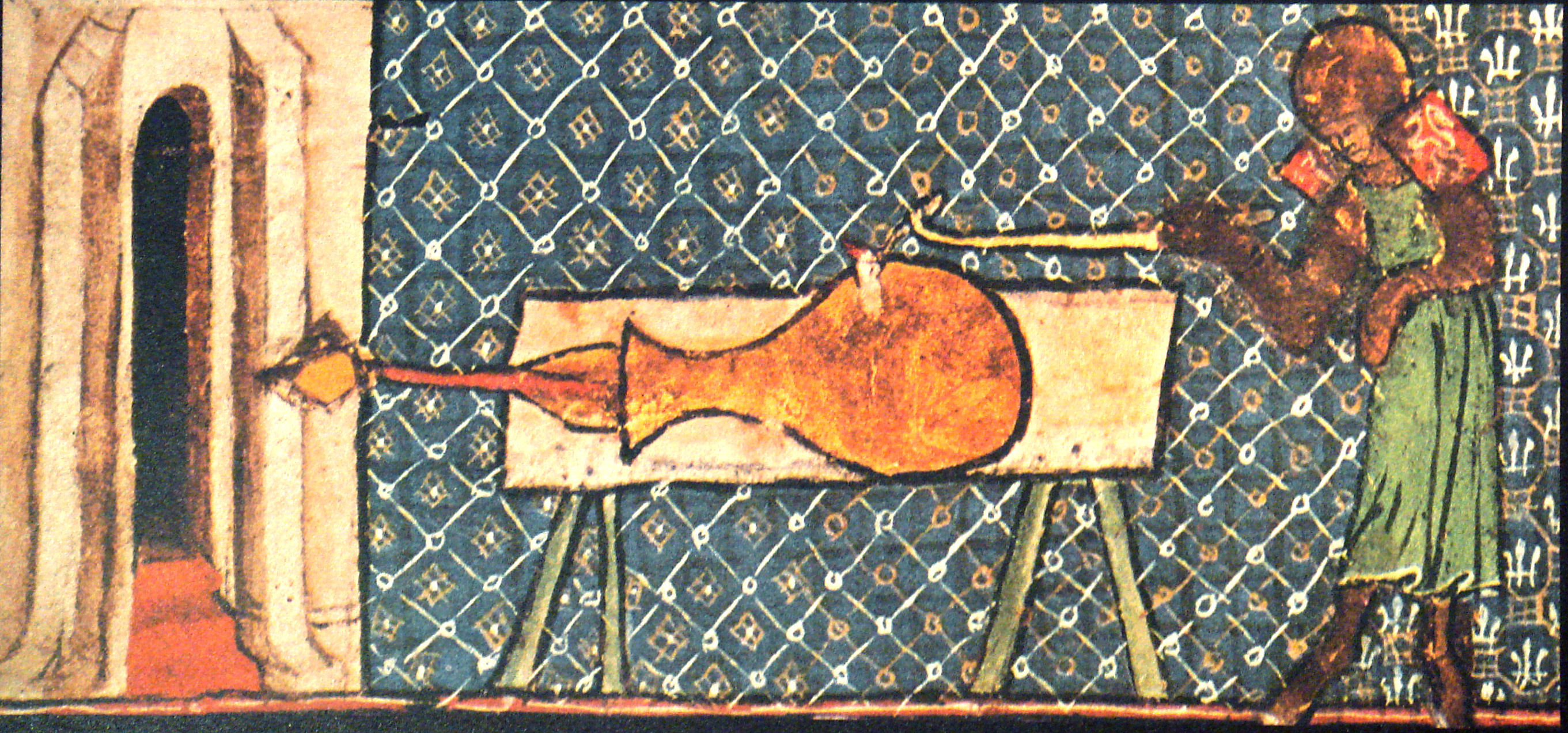
Earliest depiction of a European cannon, "De Nobilitatibus Sapientii Et Prudentiis Regum", Walter de Milemete, 1326.

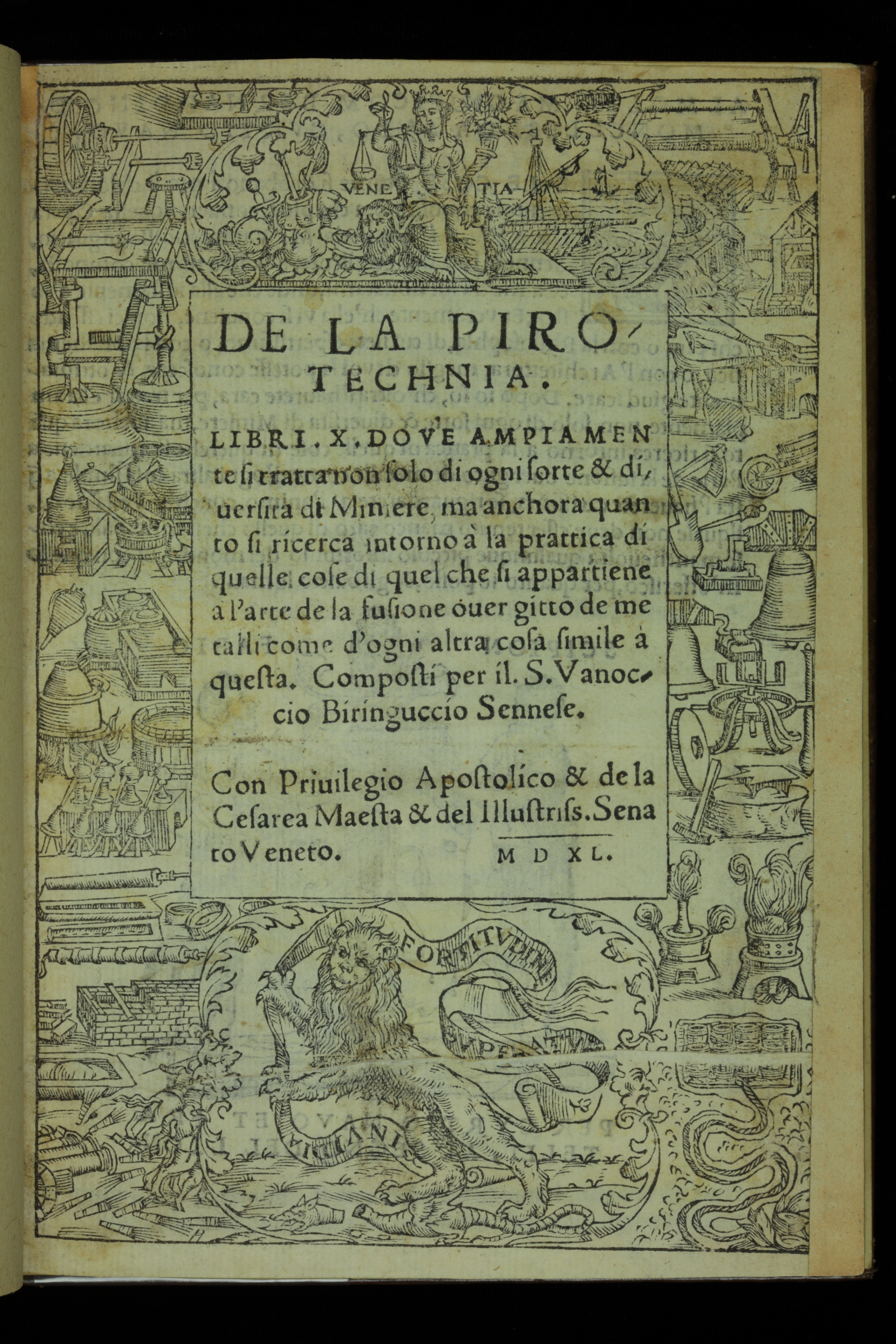
De la pirotechnia, 1540

The earliest Western accounts of gunpowder appear in texts written by English philosopher Roger Bacon in 1267 called Opus Majus and Opus Tertium. The oldest written recipes in continental Europe were recorded under the name Marcus Graecus or Mark the Greek between 1280 and 1300 in the Liber Ignium, or Book of Fires.

Some sources mention possible gunpowder weapons being deployed by the Mongols against European forces at the Battle of Mohi in 1241. Professor Kenneth Warren Chase credits the Mongols for introducing into Europe gunpowder and its associated weaponry. However, there is no clear route of transmission, and while the Mongols are often pointed to as the likeliest vector, Timothy May points out that "there is no concrete evidence that the Mongols used gunpowder weapons on a regular basis outside of China." May also states, "however [, ...] the Mongols used the gunpowder weapon in their wars against the Jin, the Song and in their invasions of Japan."

Records show that, in England, gunpowder was being made in 1346 at the Tower of London; a powder house existed at the Tower in 1461, and in 1515 three King's gunpowder makers worked there. Gunpowder was also being made or stored at other royal castles, such as Portchester. The English Civil War (1642–1645) led to an expansion of the gunpowder industry, with the repeal of the Royal Patent in August 1641.

In late 14th century Europe, gunpowder was improved by corning, the practice of drying it into small clumps to improve combustion and consistency. During this time, European manufacturers also began regularly purifying saltpeter, using wood ashes containing potassium carbonate to precipitate calcium from their dung liquor, and using ox blood, alum, and slices of turnip to clarify the solution.

During the Renaissance, two European schools of pyrotechnic thought emerged, one in Italy and the other at Nuremberg, Germany. In Italy, Vannoccio Biringuccio, born in 1480, was a member of the guild Fraternita di Santa Barbara but broke with the tradition of secrecy by setting down everything he knew in a book titled De la pirotechnia, written in vernacular. It was published posthumously in 1540, with nine editions over 138 years, and also reprinted by MIT Press in 1966.

By the mid-17th century fireworks were used for entertainment on an unprecedented scale in Europe, being popular even at resorts and public gardens. With the publication of Deutliche Anweisung zur Feuerwerkerey (1748), methods for creating fireworks were sufficiently well-known and well-described that "Firework making has become an exact science." In 1774 Louis XVI ascended to the throne of France at the age of 20. After he discovered that France was not self-sufficient in gunpowder, a Gunpowder Administration was established; to head it, the lawyer Antoine Lavoisier was appointed. Although from a bourgeois family, after his degree in law Lavoisier became wealthy from a company set up to collect taxes for the Crown; this allowed him to pursue experimental natural science as a hobby.

Without access to cheap saltpeter (controlled by the British), for hundreds of years France had relied on saltpetremen with royal warrants, the droit de fouille or "right to dig", to seize nitrous-containing soil and demolish walls of barnyards, without compensation to the owners. This caused farmers, the wealthy, or entire villages to bribe the petermen and the associated bureaucracy to leave their buildings alone and the saltpeter uncollected. Lavoisier instituted a crash program to increase saltpeter production, revised (and later eliminated) the droit de fouille, researched best refining and powder manufacturing methods, instituted management and record-keeping, and established pricing that encouraged private investment in works. Although saltpeter from new Prussian-style putrefaction works had not been produced yet (the process taking about 18 months), in only a year France had gunpowder to export. A chief beneficiary of this surplus was the American Revolution. By careful testing and adjusting the proportions and grinding time, powder from mills such as at Essonne outside Paris became the best in the world by 1788, and inexpensive.

Two British physicists, Andrew Noble and Frederick Abel, worked to improve the properties of gunpowder during the late 19th century. This formed the basis for the Noble-Abel gas equation for internal ballistics.

The introduction of smokeless powder in the late 19th century led to a contraction of the gunpowder industry. After the end of World War I, the majority of the British gunpowder manufacturers merged into a single company, "Explosives Trades limited", and a number of sites were closed down, including those in Ireland. This company became Nobel Industries Limited, and in 1926 became a founding member of Imperial Chemical Industries. The Home Office removed gunpowder from its list of "Permitted Explosives". Shortly afterwards, on 31 December 1931, the former Curtis & Harvey's Glynneath gunpowder factory at Pontneddfechan in Wales closed down. The factory was demolished by fire in 1932. The last remaining gunpowder mill at the Royal Gunpowder Factory, Waltham Abbey was damaged by a German parachute mine in 1941 and it never reopened. This was followed by the closure and demolition of the gunpowder section at the Royal Ordnance Factory, ROF Chorley, at the end of World War II, and of ICI Nobel's Roslin gunpowder factory which closed in 1954. This left ICI Nobel's Ardeer site in Scotland, which included a gunpowder factory, as the only factory in Great Britain producing gunpowder. The gunpowder area of the Ardeer site closed in October 1976.

=== India ===
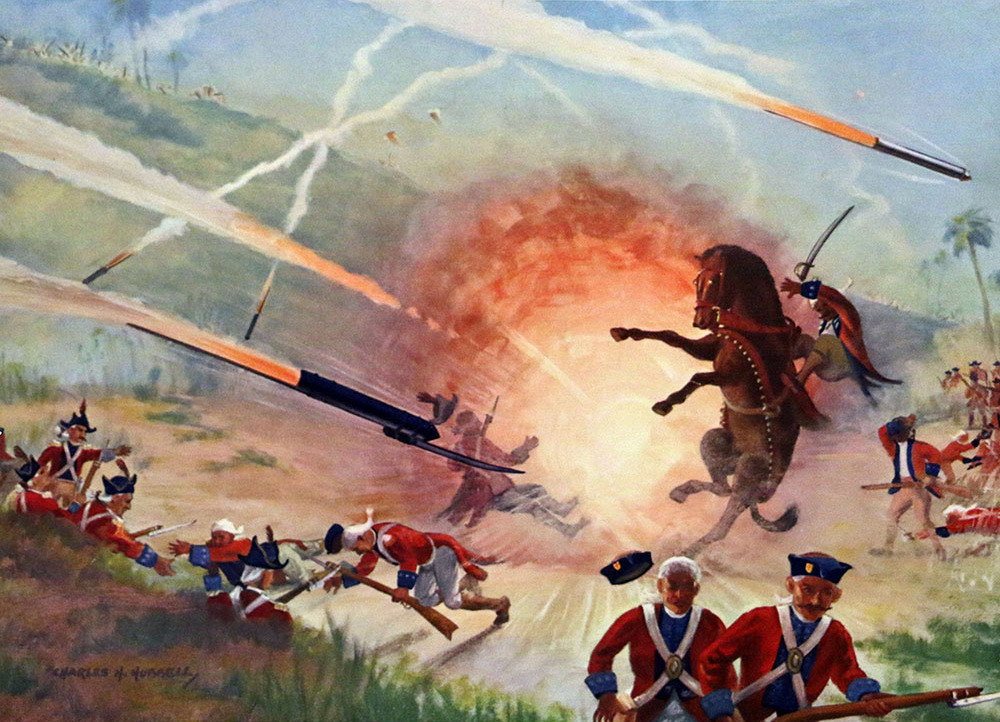
In the year 1780 the British began to annex the territories of the Sultanate of Mysore, during the Second Anglo-Mysore War. The British battalion was defeated during the Battle of Guntur, by the forces of Hyder Ali, who effectively used Mysorean rockets and rocket artillery against the closely massed British forces.

Gunpowder and gunpowder weapons were transmitted to India through the Mongol invasions of India. The Mongols were defeated by Alauddin Khalji of the Delhi Sultanate, and some of the Mongol soldiers remained in northern India after their conversion to Islam. It was written in the Tarikh-i Firishta (1606–1607) that Nasiruddin Mahmud the ruler of the Delhi Sultanate presented the envoy of the Mongol ruler Hulegu Khan with a dazzling pyrotechnics display upon his arrival in Delhi in 1258. Nasiruddin Mahmud tried to express his strength as a ruler and tried to ward off any Mongol attempt similar to the Siege of Baghdad (1258). Firearms known as top-o-tufak also existed in many Muslim kingdoms in India by as early as 1366. From then on the employment of gunpowder warfare in India was prevalent, with events such as the "Siege of Belgaum" in 1473 by Sultan Muhammad Shah Bahmani.

The shipwrecked Ottoman Admiral Seydi Ali Reis is known to have introduced the earliest type of matchlock weapons, which the Ottomans used against the Portuguese during the Siege of Diu (1531). After that, a diverse variety of firearms, large guns in particular, became visible in Tanjore, Dacca, Bijapur, and Murshidabad. Guns made of bronze were recovered from Calicut, the former capital of the Zamorins, in 1504.

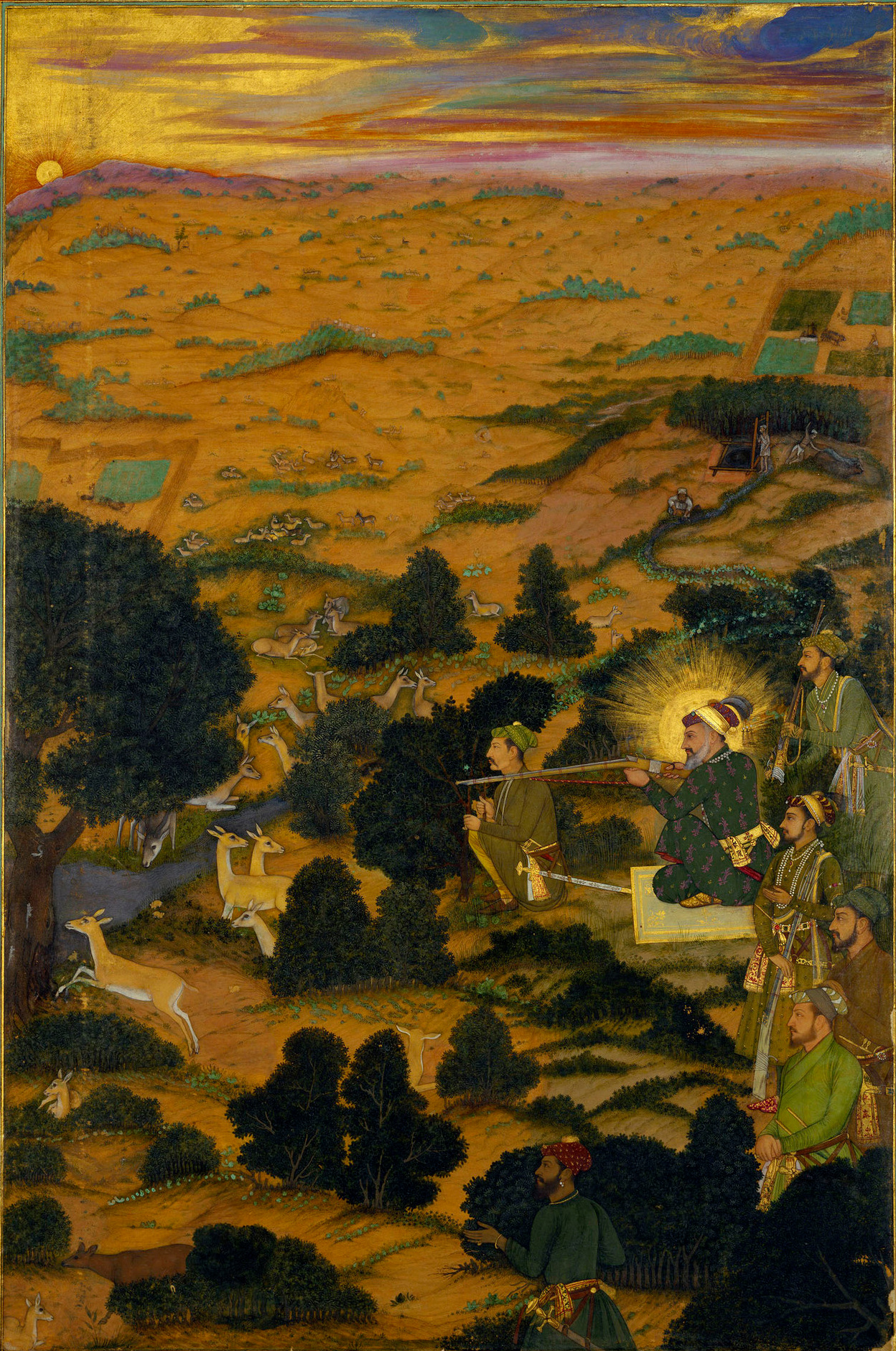
Mughal Emperor Shah Jahan, hunting deer using a matchlock

The Mughal emperor Akbar mass-produced matchlocks for the Mughal Army. Akbar is personally known to have shot a leading Rajput commander during the Siege of Chittorgarh. The Mughals began to use bamboo rockets (mainly for signalling) and employ sappers: special units that undermined heavy stone fortifications to plant gunpowder charges.

The Mughal Emperor Shah Jahan is known to have introduced much more advanced matchlocks, their designs were a combination of Ottoman and Mughal designs. Shah Jahan also countered the British and other Europeans in his province of Gujarāt, which supplied Europe saltpeter for use in gunpowder warfare during the 17th century. Bengal and Mālwa participated in saltpeter production. The Dutch, French, Portuguese, and English used Chhapra as a center of saltpeter refining.

Ever since the founding of the Sultanate of Mysore by Hyder Ali, French military officers were employed to train the Mysore Army. Hyder Ali and his son Tipu Sultan were the first to introduce modern cannons and muskets, and their army was also the first in India to have official uniforms. During the Second Anglo-Mysore War Hyder Ali and his son Tipu Sultan unleashed the Mysorean rockets at their British opponents effectively, defeating them on various occasions. The Mysorean rockets inspired the development of the Congreve rocket, which the British widely used during the Napoleonic Wars and the War of 1812.

=== Southeast Asia ===
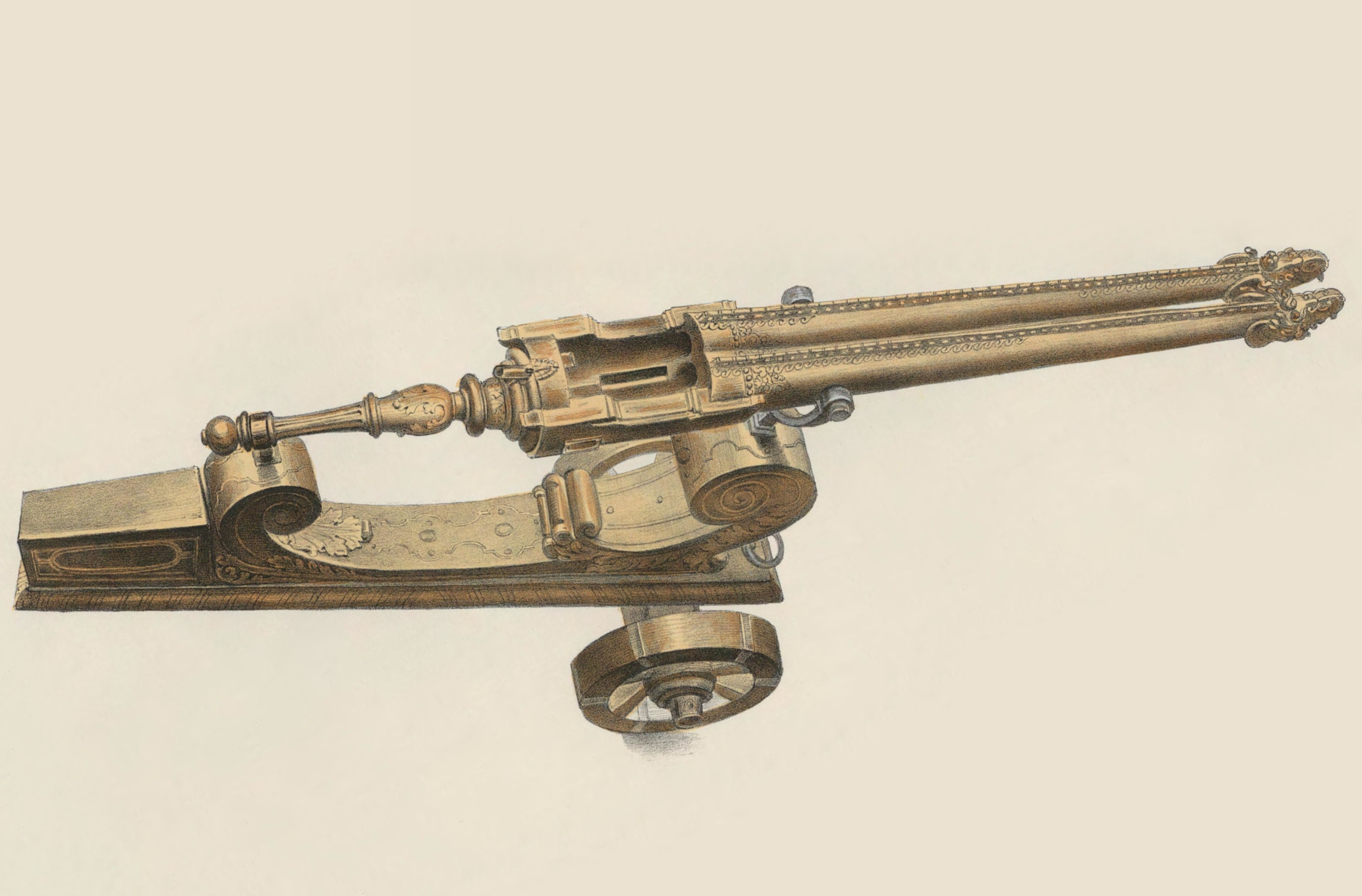
A double-barrelled cetbang on a carriage, with swivel yoke, c. 1522. The mouth of the cannon is in the shape of Javanese Nāga.

Cannons were introduced to Majapahit when Kublai Khan's Chinese army under the leadership of Ike Mese sought to invade Java in 1293. The History of Yuan mentions that the Mongol used cannons (Chinese: 炮—Pào) against Daha forces. Cannons were used by the Ayutthaya Kingdom in 1352 during its invasion of the Khmer Empire. Within a decade large quantities of gunpowder could be found in the Khmer Empire. By the end of the century firearms were also used by the Trần dynasty.

Even though the knowledge of making gunpowder-based weapons was known after the failed Mongol invasion of Java, and the predecessor of firearms, the pole gun (bedil tombak), is recorded as being used by Java in 1413, the knowledge of making "true" firearms came much later, after the middle of the 15th century. It was brought by the Islamic nations of West Asia, most probably the Arabs. The precise year of introduction is unknown, but it may be safely concluded to be no earlier than 1460. Before the arrival of the Portuguese in Southeast Asia, the natives already possessed firearms, the Java arquebus. Portuguese influence to local weaponry after the capture of Malacca (1511) resulted in a new type of hybrid tradition matchlock firearm, the istinggar.

When the Portuguese came to the archipelago, they referred to the breech-loading swivel gun as berço, while the Spaniards call it verso. By the early 16th century, the Javanese were locally producing large guns, some of them surviving until the present day and dubbed "sacred cannon" or "holy cannon". These cannons varied between 180- and 260-pounders, weighing anywhere between 3 and 8 tons, the length of them between 3 and 6 m.

Saltpeter harvesting was recorded by Dutch and German travelers as being common in even the smallest villages and was collected from the decomposition process of large dung hills specifically piled for the purpose. The Dutch punishment for possession of non-permitted gunpowder appears to have been amputation. Ownership and manufacture of gunpowder was later prohibited by the colonial Dutch occupiers. According to colonel McKenzie quoted in Sir Thomas Stamford Raffles', The History of Java (1817), the purest sulfur was supplied from a crater from a mountain near the straits of Bali.

=== Historiography ===
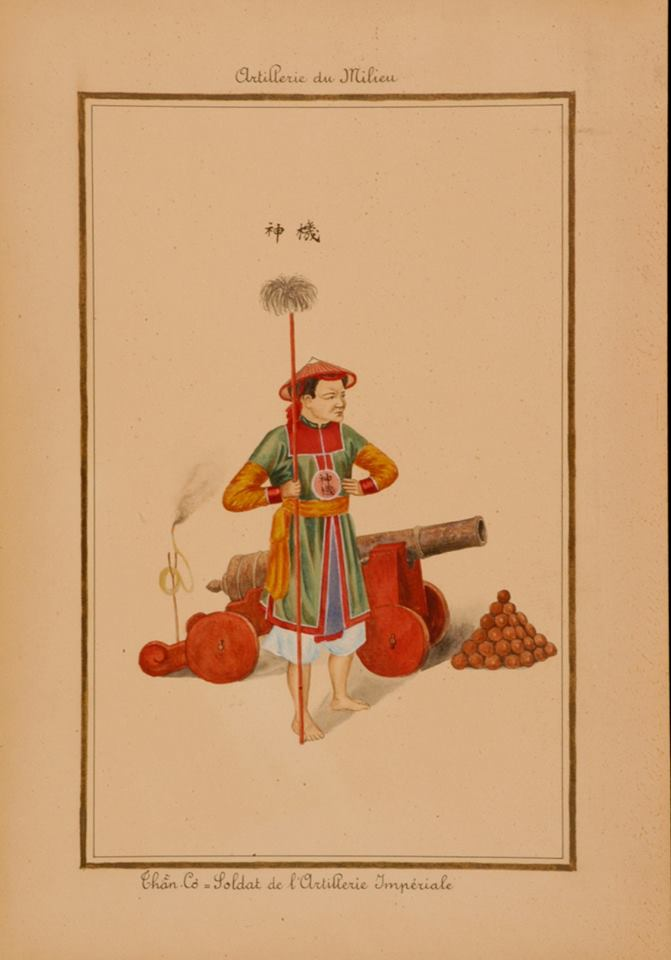
Gunner of Nguyễn dynasty, Vietnam

On the origins of gunpowder technology, historian Tonio Andrade remarked, "Scholars today overwhelmingly concur that the gun was invented in China." Gunpowder and the gun are widely believed by historians to have originated from China due to the large body of evidence that documents the evolution of gunpowder from a medicine to an incendiary and explosive, and the evolution of the gun from the fire lance to a metal gun, whereas similar records do not exist elsewhere. As Andrade explains, the large amount of variation in gunpowder recipes in China relative to Europe is "evidence of experimentation in China, where gunpowder was at first used as an incendiary and only later became an explosive and a propellant... in contrast, formulas in Europe diverged only very slightly from the ideal proportions for use as an explosive and a propellant, suggesting that gunpowder was introduced as a mature technology."

However, the history of gunpowder is not without controversy. A major problem confronting the study of early gunpowder history is ready access to sources close to the events described. Often the first records potentially describing use of gunpowder in warfare were written several centuries after the fact, and may well have been colored by the contemporary experiences of the chronicler. Translation difficulties have led to errors or loose interpretations bordering on artistic licence. Ambiguous language can make it difficult to distinguish gunpowder weapons from similar technologies that do not rely on gunpowder. A commonly cited example is a report of the Battle of Mohi in Eastern Europe that mentions a "long lance" sending forth "evil-smelling vapors and smoke", which has been variously interpreted by different historians as the "first-gas attack upon European soil" using gunpowder, "the first use of cannon in Europe", or merely a "toxic gas" with no evidence of gunpowder. It is difficult to accurately translate original Chinese alchemical texts, which tend to explain phenomena through metaphor, into modern scientific language with rigidly defined terminology in English. Early texts potentially mentioning gunpowder are sometimes marked by a linguistic process where semantic change occurred. For instance, the Arabic word naft transitioned from denoting naphtha to denoting gunpowder, and the Chinese word pào changed in meaning from trebuchet to a cannon. This has led to arguments on the exact origins of gunpowder based on etymological foundations. Science and technology historian Bert S. Hall makes the observation that, "It goes without saying, however, that historians bent on special pleading, or simply with axes of their own to grind, can find rich material in these terminological thickets."

Another major area of contention in modern studies of the history of gunpowder is regarding the transmission of gunpowder. While the literary and archaeological evidence supports a Chinese origin for gunpowder and guns, the manner in which gunpowder technology was transferred from China to the West is still under debate. It is unknown why the rapid spread of gunpowder technology across Eurasia took place over several decades whereas other technologies such as paper, the compass, and printing did not reach Europe until centuries after they were invented in China.

== Components ==
Gunpowder is a granular mixture of:

- a nitrate, typically potassium nitrate (KNO_{3}), which supplies oxygen for the reaction;
- charcoal, which provides carbon and other fuel for the reaction, simplified as carbon (C);
- sulfur (S), which, while also serving as a fuel, lowers the temperature required to ignite the mixture, thereby increasing the rate of combustion.

Potassium nitrate is the most important ingredient in terms of both bulk and function because the combustion process releases oxygen from the potassium nitrate, promoting the rapid burning of the other ingredients. To reduce the likelihood of accidental ignition by static electricity, the granules of modern gunpowder are typically coated with graphite, which prevents the build-up of electrostatic charge.

Charcoal does not consist of pure carbon; rather, it consists of partially pyrolyzed cellulose, in which the wood is not completely decomposed. Carbon differs from ordinary charcoal. Whereas charcoal's autoignition temperature is relatively low, carbon's is much greater. Thus, a gunpowder composition containing pure carbon would burn similarly to a match head, at best.

The current standard composition for the gunpowder manufactured by pyrotechnicians was adopted as long ago as 1780. Proportions by weight are 75% potassium nitrate (known as saltpeter or saltpetre), 15% softwood charcoal, and 10% sulfur. These ratios have varied over the centuries and by country, and can be altered somewhat depending on the purpose of the powder. For instance, power grades of black powder, unsuitable for use in firearms but adequate for blasting rock in quarrying operations, are called blasting powder rather than gunpowder with standard proportions of 70% nitrate, 14% charcoal, and 16% sulfur; blasting powder may be made with the cheaper sodium nitrate substituted for potassium nitrate and proportions may be as low as 40% nitrate, 30% charcoal, and 30% sulfur. In 1857, Lammot du Pont solved the main problem of using cheaper sodium nitrate formulations when he patented DuPont "B" blasting powder. After manufacturing grains from press-cake in the usual way, his process tumbled the powder with graphite dust for 12 hours. This formed a graphite coating on each grain that reduced its ability to absorb moisture.

Neither the use of graphite nor sodium nitrate was new. Glossing gunpowder corns with graphite was already an accepted technique in 1839, and sodium nitrate-based blasting powder had been made in Peru for many years using the sodium nitrate mined at Tarapacá (now in Chile). Also, in 1846, two plants were built in south-west England to make blasting powder using this sodium nitrate. The idea may well have been brought from Peru by Cornish miners returning home after completing their contracts. Another suggestion is that it was William Lobb, the plant collector, who recognised the possibilities of sodium nitrate during his travels in South America. Lammot du Pont would have known about the use of graphite, and probably also knew about the plants in south-west England. In his patent he was careful to state that his claim was for the combination of graphite with sodium nitrate–based powder, rather than for either of the two individual technologies.

French war powder in 1879 used the ratio 75% saltpeter, 12.5% charcoal, 12.5% sulfur. English war powder in 1879 used the ratio 75% saltpeter, 15% charcoal, 10% sulfur. The British Congreve rockets used 62.4% saltpeter, 23.2% charcoal and 14.4% sulfur, but the British Mark VII gunpowder was changed to 65% saltpeter, 20% charcoal and 15% sulfur. The explanation for the wide variety in formulation relates to usage. Powder used for rocketry can use a slower burn rate since it accelerates the projectile for a much longer time—whereas powders for weapons such as flintlocks, cap-locks, or matchlocks need a higher burn rate to accelerate the projectile in a much shorter distance. Cannons usually used lower burn-rate powders, because most would burst with higher burn-rate powders.

=== Other compositions ===
Besides black powder, there are other historically important types of gunpowder. "Brown gunpowder" is cited as composed of 79% nitre, 3% sulfur, and 18% charcoal per 100 of dry powder, with about 2% moisture. Prismatic Brown Powder is a large-grained product that the Rottweil Company introduced in 1884 in Germany, which was adopted by the British Royal Navy shortly thereafter. The French navy adopted a fine, 3.1 millimeter, not prismatic grained product called Slow Burning Cocoa (SBC) or "cocoa powder". These brown powders reduced burning rate even further by using as little as 2 percent sulfur and using charcoal made from rye straw that had not been completely charred, hence the brown color.

Lesmok powder was a product developed by DuPont in 1911, one of several semi-smokeless products in the industry containing a mixture of black and nitrocellulose powder. It was sold to Winchester and others primarily for .22 and .32 small calibers. Its advantage was that it was believed at the time to be less corrosive than smokeless powders then in use. It was not understood in the U.S. until the 1920s that the actual source of corrosion was the potassium chloride residue from potassium chlorate sensitized primers. The bulkier black powder fouling better disperses primer residue. Failure to mitigate primer corrosion by dispersion caused the false impression that nitrocellulose-based powder caused corrosion. Lesmok had some of the bulk of black powder for dispersing primer residue, but somewhat less total bulk than straight black powder, thus requiring less frequent bore cleaning. It was last sold by Winchester in 1947.

=== Sulfur-free powders ===
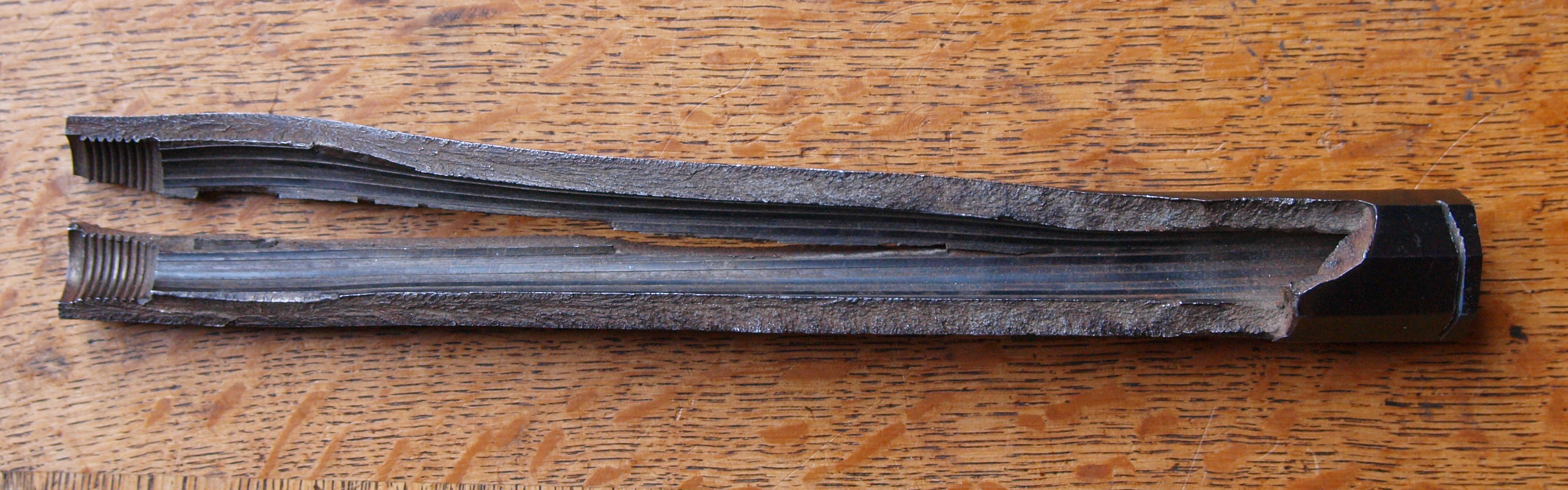
Burst barrel of a muzzle loader pistol replica, which was loaded with nitrocellulose powder instead of black powder and could not withstand the higher pressures of the modern propellant

The development of smokeless powders, such as cordite, in the late 19th century created the need for a spark-sensitive priming charge, such as gunpowder. However, the sulfur content of traditional gunpowders caused corrosion problems with Cordite Mk I and this led to the introduction of a range of sulfur-free gunpowders, of varying grain sizes. They typically contain 70.5% of saltpeter and 29.5% of charcoal. Like black powder, they were produced in different grain sizes. In the United Kingdom, the finest grain was known as sulfur-free mealed powder (SMP). Coarser grains were numbered as sulfur-free gunpowder (SFG n): 'SFG 12', 'SFG 20', 'SFG 40' and 'SFG 90', for example where the number represents the smallest BSS sieve mesh size, which retained no grains.

Sulfur's main role in gunpowder is to decrease the ignition temperature. A sample reaction for sulfur-free gunpowder would be:

$$\ce{6 KNO3 + C7H4O -> 3 K2CO3 + 4 CO2 + 2 H2O + 3 N2}$$

=== Smokeless powders ===
The term black powder was coined in the late 19th century, primarily in the United States, to distinguish prior gunpowder formulations from the new smokeless powders and semi-smokeless powders. Semi-smokeless powders featured bulk volume properties that approximated black powder, but had significantly reduced amounts of smoke and combustion products. Smokeless powder has different burning properties (pressure vs. time) and can generate higher pressures and work per gram. This can rupture older weapons designed for black powder. Smokeless powders ranged in color from brownish tan to yellow to white. Most of the bulk semi-smokeless powders ceased to be manufactured in the 1920s.

== Granularity ==
=== Serpentine ===
The original dry-compounded powder used in 15th-century Europe was known as "Serpentine", either a reference to Satan or to a common artillery piece that used it. The ingredients were ground together with a mortar and pestle, perhaps for 24 hours, resulting in a fine flour. Vibration during transportation could cause the components to separate again, requiring remixing in the field. Also, if the quality of the saltpeter was low (for instance if it was contaminated with highly hygroscopic calcium nitrate), or if the powder was simply old (due to the mildly hygroscopic nature of potassium nitrate), in humid weather it would need to be re-dried. The dust from "repairing" powder in the field was a major hazard.

Loading cannons or bombards before the powder-making advances of the Renaissance was a skilled art. Fine powder loaded haphazardly or too tightly would burn incompletely or too slowly. Typically, the breech-loading powder chamber in the rear of the piece was filled only about half full, the serpentine powder neither too compressed nor too loose, a wooden bung pounded in to seal the chamber from the barrel when assembled, and the projectile placed on. A carefully determined empty space was necessary for the charge to burn effectively. When the cannon was fired through the touchhole, turbulence from the initial surface combustion caused the rest of the powder to be rapidly exposed to the flame.

The advent of much more powerful and easy to use corned powder changed this procedure, but serpentine was used with older guns into the 17th century.

=== Corning ===
For propellants to oxidize and burn rapidly and effectively, the combustible ingredients must be reduced to the smallest possible particle sizes, and be as thoroughly mixed as possible. Once mixed, however, for better results in a gun, makers discovered that the final product should be in the form of individual dense grains that spread the fire quickly from grain to grain, much as straw or twigs catch fire more quickly than a pile of sawdust.

In late 14th century Europe and China, gunpowder was improved by wet grinding; liquid such as distilled spirits were added during the grinding-together of the ingredients and the moist paste dried afterwards. The principle of wet mixing to prevent the separation of dry ingredients, invented for gunpowder, is used today in the pharmaceutical industry. It was discovered that if the paste was rolled into balls before drying the resulting gunpowder absorbed less water from the air during storage and traveled better. The balls were then crushed in a mortar by the gunner immediately before use, with the old problem of uneven particle size and packing causing unpredictable results. If the right size particles were chosen, however, the result was a great improvement in power. Forming the damp paste into corn-sized clumps by hand or with the use of a sieve instead of larger balls produced a product after drying that loaded much better, as each tiny piece provided its own surrounding air space that allowed much more rapid combustion than a fine powder. This "corned" gunpowder was from 30% to 300% more powerful. An example is cited where 15 kilograms (34 lb) of serpentine was needed to shoot a 21-kilogram (47 lb) ball, but only 8.2 kilograms (18 lb) of corned powder.

Because the dry powdered ingredients must be mixed and bonded together for extrusion and cut into grains to maintain the blend, size reduction and mixing is done while the ingredients are damp, usually with water. After 1800, instead of forming grains by hand or with sieves, the damp mill-cake was pressed in molds to increase its density and extract the liquid, forming press-cake. The pressing took varying amounts of time, depending on conditions such as atmospheric humidity. The hard, dense product was broken again into tiny pieces, which were separated with sieves to produce a uniform product for each purpose: coarse powders for cannons, finer grained powders for muskets, and the finest for small hand guns and priming. Inappropriately fine-grained powder often caused cannons to burst before the projectile could move down the barrel, due to the high initial spike in pressure. Mammoth powder with large grains, made for Rodman's 15-inch cannon, reduced the pressure to only 20 percent as high as ordinary cannon powder would have produced.

In the mid-19th century, measurements were made determining that the burning rate within a grain of black powder (or a tightly packed mass) is about 6 cm/s (0.20 feet/s), while the rate of ignition propagation from grain to grain is around 9 m/s (30 feet/s), over two orders of magnitude faster.

=== Modern types ===
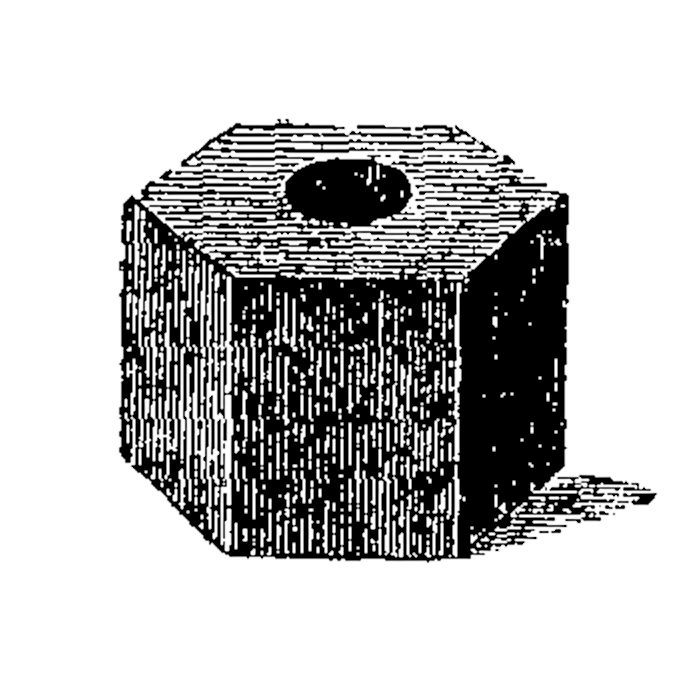
Hexagonal gunpowder for large artillery

Modern corning first compresses the fine black powder meal into blocks with a fixed density (1.7 g/cm^{3}). In the United States, gunpowder grains were designated F (for fine) or C (for coarse). Grain diameter decreased with a larger number of Fs and increased with a larger number of Cs, ranging from about 2 mm (1/16 in) for 7F to 15 mm (9/16 in) for 7C. Even larger grains were produced for artillery bore diameters greater than about 17 cm (6.7 in). The standard DuPont Mammoth powder developed by Thomas Rodman and Lammot du Pont for use during the American Civil War had grains averaging 15 mm (0.6 in) in diameter with edges rounded in a glazing barrel. Other versions had grains the size of golf and tennis balls for use in 20-inch (51 cm) Rodman guns. In 1875 DuPont introduced Hexagonal powder for large artillery, which was pressed using shaped plates with a small center core—about 38 mm (1 1/2 in) diameter, like a wagon wheel nut, the center hole widened as the grain burned. By 1882 German makers also produced hexagonal grained powders of a similar size for artillery.

By the late 19th century manufacturing focused on standard grades of black powder from Fg used in large bore rifles and shotguns, through FFg (medium and small-bore arms such as muskets and fusils), FFFg (small-bore rifles and pistols), and FFFFg (extreme small bore, short pistols and most commonly for priming flintlocks). A coarser grade for use in military artillery blanks was designated A-1. These grades were sorted on a system of screens with oversize retained on a mesh of 6 wires per inch, A-1 retained on 10 wires per inch, Fg retained on 14, FFg on 24, FFFg on 46, and FFFFg on 60. Fines designated FFFFFg were usually reprocessed to minimize explosive dust hazards. In the United Kingdom the main service gunpowders were classified RFG (rifle grained fine) with diameter of one or two millimeters and RLG (rifle grained large) for grain diameters between two and six millimeters. Gunpowder grains can alternatively be categorized by mesh size: the BSS sieve mesh size, being the smallest mesh size, which retains no grains. Recognized grain sizes are Gunpowder G 7, G 20, G 40, and G 90.

Owing to the large market of antique and replica black-powder firearms in the US, modern black powder substitutes like Pyrodex, Triple Seven and Black Mag3 pellets have been developed since the 1970s. These products, which should not be confused with smokeless powders, aim to produce less fouling (solid residue), while maintaining the traditional volumetric measurement system for charges. Claims of less corrosiveness of these products have been controversial however. New cleaning products for black-powder guns have also been developed for this market.

== Chemistry ==
A simple, commonly cited, chemical equation for the combustion of gunpowder is:

2 KNO_{3} + S + 3 C → K_{2}S + N_{2} + 3 CO_{2}.

A balanced, but still simplified, equation is:

10 KNO_{3} + 3 S + 8 C → 2 K_{2}CO_{3} + 3 K_{2}SO_{4} + 6 CO_{2} + 5 N_{2}.

The exact percentages of ingredients varied greatly through the medieval period as the recipes were developed by trial and error, and needed to be updated for changing military technology.

Gunpowder does not burn as a single reaction, so the byproducts are not easily predicted. One study showed that it produced (in order of descending quantities) 55.91% solid products: potassium carbonate, potassium sulfate, potassium sulfide, sulfur, potassium nitrate, potassium thiocyanate, carbon, ammonium carbonate and 42.98% gaseous products: carbon dioxide, nitrogen, carbon monoxide, hydrogen sulfide, hydrogen, methane, 1.11% water.

Gunpowder made with less-expensive and more plentiful sodium nitrate instead of potassium nitrate (in appropriate proportions) works just as well. Gunpowder releases 3 megajoules per kilogram and contains its own oxidant. This is less than TNT (4.7 megajoules per kilogram), or gasoline (47.2 megajoules per kilogram in combustion, but gasoline requires an oxidant; for instance, an optimized gasoline and O_{2} mixture releases 10.4 megajoules per kilogram, taking into account the mass of the oxygen).

Gunpowder also has a low energy density compared to modern "smokeless" powders, and thus to achieve high energy loadings, large amounts are needed with heavy projectiles.

== Production ==
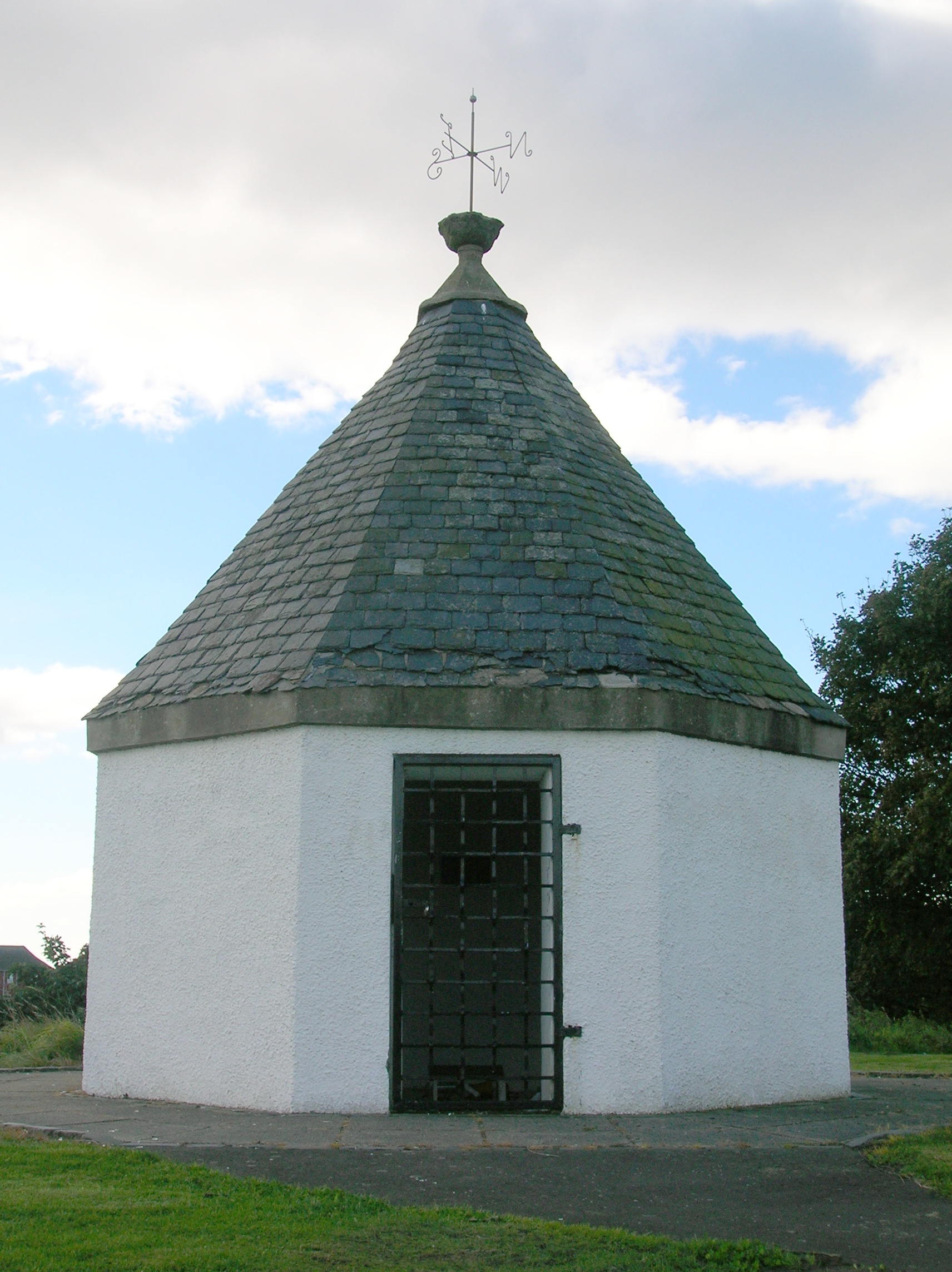
The old Powder or Pouther magazine dating from 1642, built by order of Charles I. Irvine, North Ayrshire, Scotland

For the most powerful black powder, meal powder, a wood charcoal is used. The best wood for the purpose is Pacific willow, but others such as alder or buckthorn can be used. In Great Britain between the 15th and 19th centuries charcoal from alder buckthorn was greatly prized for gunpowder manufacture; cottonwood was used by the American Confederate States. The ingredients are reduced in particle size and mixed as intimately as possible. Originally, this was with a mortar-and-pestle or a similarly operating stamping-mill, using copper, bronze or other non-sparking materials, until supplanted by the rotating ball mill principle with non-sparking bronze or lead. Historically, a marble or limestone edge runner mill, running on a limestone bed, was used in Great Britain; however, by the mid 19th century this had changed to either an iron-shod stone wheel or a cast iron wheel running on an iron bed. The mix was dampened with alcohol or water during grinding to prevent accidental ignition. This also helps the extremely soluble saltpeter to mix into the microscopic pores of the very high surface-area charcoal.

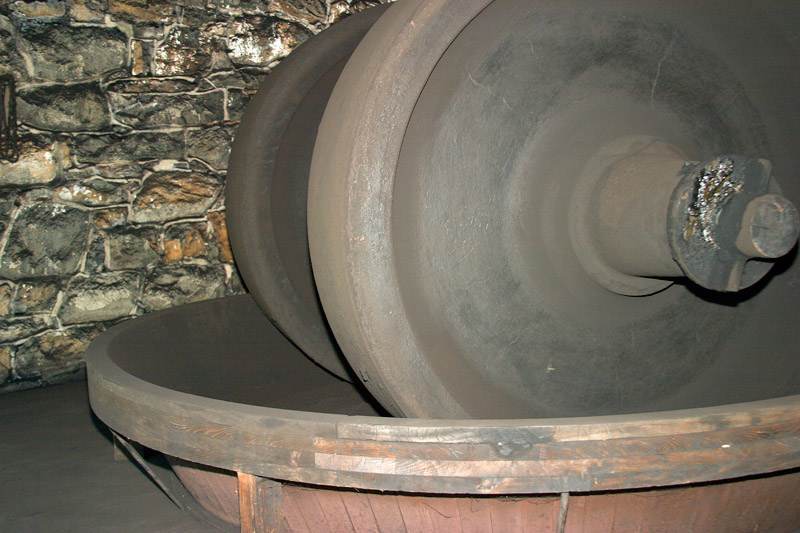
Edge-runner mill in a restored mill, at The Hagley Museum

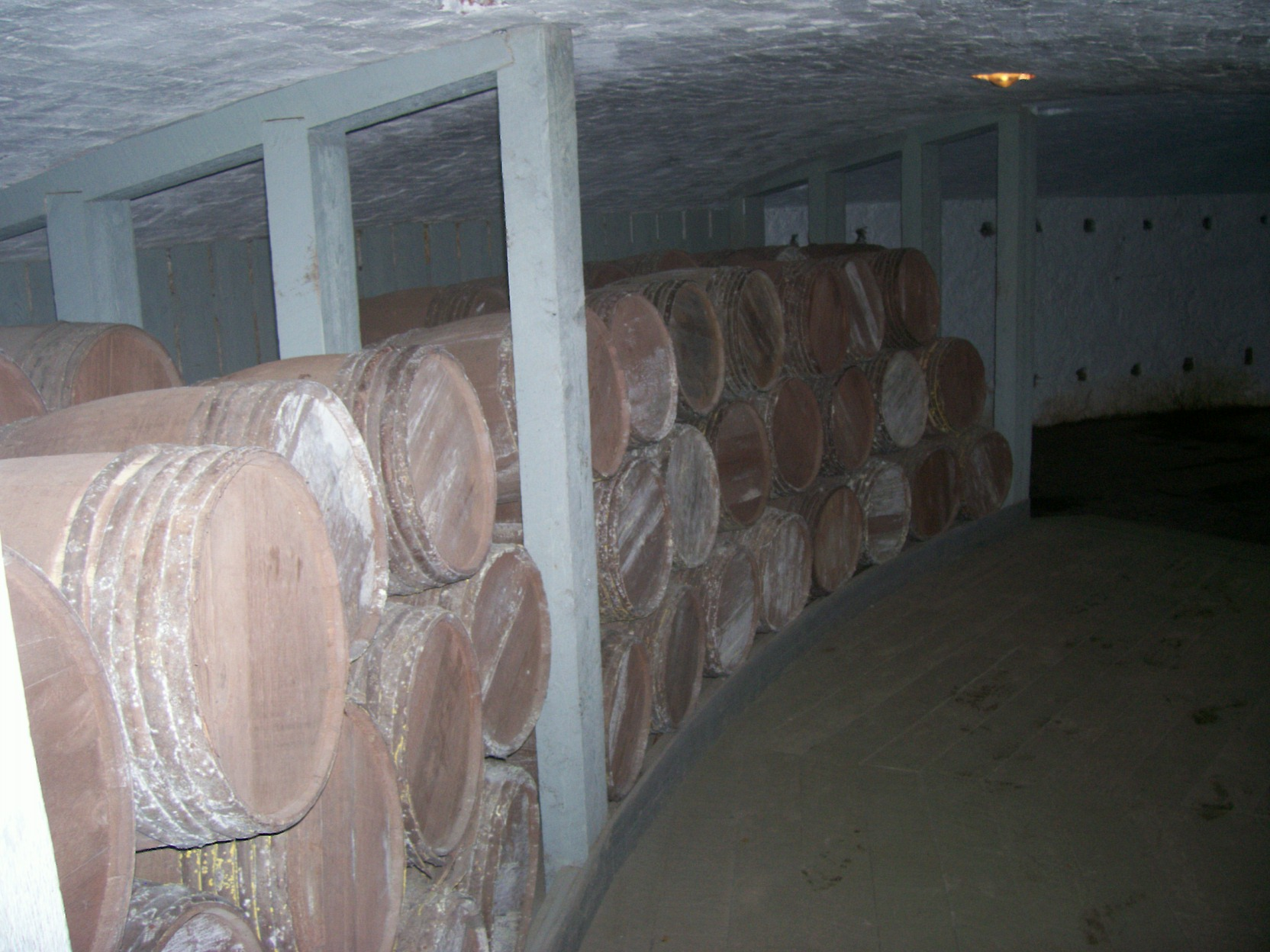
Gunpowder storing barrels at the Martello tower in Point Pleasant Park, Halifax, Nova Scotia, Canada

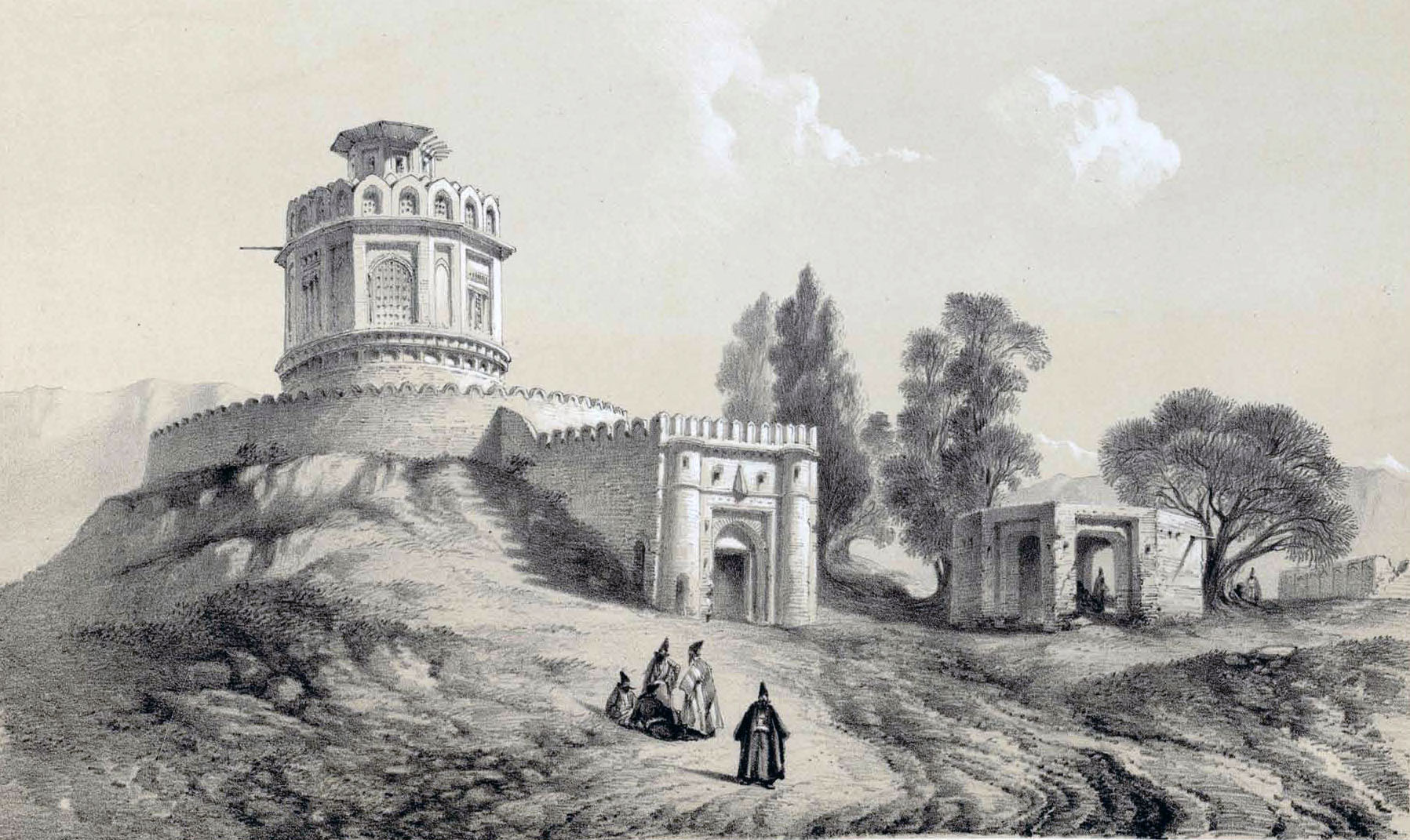
1840 drawing of a gunpowder magazine near Tehran, Persia. Gunpowder was extensively used in the Naderian Wars.

Around the late 14th century, European powdermakers first began adding liquid during grinding to improve mixing, reduce dust, and with it the risk of explosion. The powder-makers would then shape the resulting paste of dampened gunpowder, known as mill cake, into corns, or grains, to dry. Not only did corned powder keep better because of its reduced surface area, gunners also found that it was more powerful and easier to load into guns. Before long, powder-makers standardized the process by forcing mill cake through sieves instead of corning powder by hand.

The improvement was based on reducing the surface area of a higher density composition. At the beginning of the 19th century, makers increased density further by static pressing. They shoveled damp mill cake into a two-foot square box, placed this beneath a screw press and reduced it to half its volume. "Press cake" had the hardness of slate. They broke the dried slabs with hammers or rollers, and sorted the granules with sieves into different grades. In the United States, Éleuthère Irénée du Pont, who had learned the trade from Lavoisier, tumbled the dried grains in rotating barrels to round the edges and increase durability during shipping and handling. (Sharp grains rounded off in transport, producing fine "meal dust" that changed the burning properties.)

Another advance was the manufacture of kiln charcoal by distilling wood in heated iron retorts instead of burning it in earthen pits. Controlling the temperature influenced the power and consistency of the finished gunpowder. In 1863, in response to high prices for Indian saltpeter, DuPont chemists developed a process using potash or mined potassium chloride to convert plentiful Chilean sodium nitrate to potassium nitrate.

The following year (1864) the Gatebeck Low Gunpowder Works in Cumbria (Great Britain) started a plant to manufacture potassium nitrate by essentially the same chemical process. This is nowadays called the 'Wakefield Process', after the owners of the company. It would have used potassium chloride from the Staßfurt mines, near Magdeburg, Germany, which had recently become available in industrial quantities.

During the 18th century, gunpowder factories became increasingly more dependent on mechanical energy. Despite mechanization, production difficulties related to humidity control, especially during the pressing, were still present in the late 19th century. A paper from 1885 laments that "Gunpowder is such a nervous and sensitive spirit, that in almost every process of manufacture it changes under our hands as the weather changes." Pressing times to the desired density could vary by a factor of three depending on the atmospheric humidity.

== Legal status ==
The United Nations Recommendations on the Transport of Dangerous Goods and national transportation authorities, such as United States Department of Transportation, have classified gunpowder (black powder) as a Group A: Primary explosive substance for shipment as it ignites easily. Complete manufactured devices containing black powder are usually classified as Group D: Secondary detonating substance, or black powder, or article containing secondary detonating substance, such as firework, class D model rocket engine, etc., for shipment because they are harder to ignite than loose powder. As explosives, they all fall into the category of Class 1.

== Other uses ==
Besides its use as a propellant in firearms and artillery, black powder's other main use has been as a blasting powder in quarrying, mining, and road construction (including railroad construction). During the 19th century, outside of war emergencies such as the Crimean War or the American Civil War, more black powder was used in these industrial uses than in firearms and artillery. Dynamite gradually replaced it for those uses. Today, industrial explosives for such uses are still a huge market, but most of the market is in newer explosives rather than black powder.

Beginning in the 1930s, gunpowder or smokeless powder was used in rivet guns, stun guns for animals, cable splicers and other industrial construction tools. The "stud gun", a powder-actuated tool, drove nails or screws into solid concrete, a function not possible with hydraulic tools, and today is still an important part of various industries, but the cartridges usually use smokeless powders. Industrial shotguns have been used to eliminate persistent material rings in operating rotary kilns (such as those for cement, lime, phosphate, etc.) and clinker in operating furnaces, and commercial tools make the method more reliable.

Gunpowder has occasionally been employed for other purposes besides weapons, mining, fireworks and construction:

- After the Battle of Aspern-Essling (1809), Dominique-Jean Larrey, the surgeon of the Napoleonic Army, lacking salt, seasoned a horse meat bouillon for the wounded under his care with gunpowder. It was also used for sterilization in ships when there was no alcohol.
- British sailors used gunpowder to create tattoos when ink was unavailable, by pricking the skin and rubbing the powder into the wound in a method known as traumatic tattooing.
- Christiaan Huygens experimented with gunpowder in 1673 in an early attempt to build an gunpowder engine, but he did not succeed. Modern attempts to recreate his invention were similarly unsuccessful.
- Near London in 1853, a Captain Shrapnel demonstrated a mineral processing use of black powder in a method for crushing gold-bearing ores by firing them from a cannon into an iron chamber, and "much satisfaction was expressed by all present". He hoped it would be useful on the goldfields of California and Australia. Nothing came of the invention, as continuously operating crushing machines that achieved more reliable comminution were already coming into use.
- Starting in 1967, Los Angeles–based artist Ed Ruscha began using gunpowder as an artistic medium for a series of works on paper.

Gunpowder had originally been produced for medicinal purposes. It was eaten, in the expectation of curing digestive ailments; inhaled, for respiratory disorders; and, as mentioned, rubbed onto skin level disorders like rashes or burns.

== See also ==
- Ballistics
- Berthold Schwarz
- Black powder rocket motor
- Black powder substitute
- Bulk loaded liquid propellants
- Faversham explosives industry
- Gunpowder magazine
- Gunpowder Plot
- Gunpowder warfare
- Technology of the Song dynasty
