= Bulk loaded liquid propellants =

Bulk-loaded liquid propellants (BLP) are an artillery technology that was pursued at the U.S. Army Research Laboratory and U.S. Naval Weapons Center from the 1950s through the 1990s. The advantages would be simpler guns and a wider range of tactical and logistic options. Better accuracy and tactical flexibility would theoretically come from standard shells with varying propellant loads, and logistic simplification by eliminating varying powder loads.

In general, BLP guns have proven to be unsafe to operate, and they have never entered service.

== Gun fuels ==
Several propellants were tried in various programs:

One of the later (1991) successful gun fuels was a saturated solution of ammonium perchlorate in ammonia. This has a vapor pressure of one atmosphere at 20 °C (68 °F), and generally forms a convenient liquid that is stable and possible to handle. The mixture is notable for its low burning temperature per impetus, with resulting lowered damage to expensive gun tubes and liners, or alternatively, increased firing rates. A typical impetus is 388,000 ft-lb/lb. The ammonia vapors are toxic, but the toxicity is readily apparent to ordinary people and can be handled with normal industrial precautions.

In the 1950s through 1970s, a mixture of 63% hydrazine, 32% hydrazine nitrate and 5% water was used in experimental 37mm gun firings and later in 120mm gun firings. The 32% hydrazine nitrate mixture was selected by extensive experiments to have a notably flat pressure profile, increasing gun safety.

Otto Fuel II, a mixture of the low explosive propylene glycol dinitrate with a stabilizer, has also been tried in 37mm guns.

In 1981, the Naval Weapons Center tried a 350 round/minute cyclic bipropellant gun, using 90% nitric acid and a proprietary hydrocarbon (probably a low molecular weight alkane, like propane). High or low breech pressures could be obtained by varying the surface to volume ratio of the injector. Varying the oxidizer ratio could change performance. Ullage, the injection pressure, affected the reliability of the gun, but not its safety or operation.

Another tested gun fuel is NOS-365. This is a mixture of hydroxylammonium nitrate, isopropylammonium nitrate and water.

== Gun ignition issues ==
In general, hydrodynamic effects make the ignition process unpredictable. Bubbles can form in uncontrolled ways, causing varying surface areas and therefore varying pressure profiles. The result can be widely varying pressures in the breech and tube that cause unexpected gun stresses and safety problems. Most programs have reported failures, some spectacular, with each failure generally ending the program that had it.

Variations of igniter venting, ignition energy and chamber configuration can make the ignition more reliable, and the pressure profile more predictable. However, as of the 1993 survey by Knapton et al., no designed, hydrodynamic models of BLP guns had actually been validated.

Tactically, there can be widely varying accuracies in range, exactly the opposite of one hoped-for tactical advantage. The best systems report 1 to 1.5% single standard deviation (i.e. large) variations in the throw.Over 40 km (25 mi) ranges, this is a 150 m (490 ft) irreducible error.

The failure of the last firing of the Army Research Lab 120mm BLP gun, with the hydrazine mixture, was attributed to incomplete ignition. The post-firing review found that a failure of the foil in the ignition charge vented ignition gases via the igniter, as well as into the propellant. The poorly ignited charge moved the projectile partially down the tube, increasing the surface area of the propellant. The increased surface area of the propellant then ignited in the tube, raising pressures in parts of the gun not designed for them. The large overpressure caused "catastrophic tube failure" (an explosion destroying the gun tube).

In 1977, the Naval Weapons Center tested the 25 mm (0.98 in) bipropellant nitric-acid/hydrocarbon gun. At one point, "too fine" a mixture caused a catastrophic failure.

In 1981, under a DARPA contract, Pulse Power Systems Inc. performed substantial development of a high-performance automatic 75mm BLP gun using NOS-365. Round 205 had an apparent high order detonation of the propellant, which was thought impossible. Metallurgic examination of the tube fragments determined that cumulative damage may have occurred from overpressures of earlier rounds. Examination of the pressure profile of Round 206, which had another catastrophic failure, showed anomalously low pressures followed by a pressure spike, which appeared to be the burning of a bubbly froth of monopropellant that transited to a detonation as the pressure increased. This was attributed to poor procedures to handle and pressurize the fuel.
