= Meal powder =

Meal powder is the fine dust left over when black powder (gunpowder) is corned and screened to separate it into different grain sizes. It is used extensively in various pyrotechnic procedures, usually to prime other compositions. It can also be used in many fireworks to add power and substantially increasing the height of the firework. The powder has occasionally been used as a synonym for Serpentine powder, which it physically resembles.

'Mill meal' powder is a mixture of potassium nitrate, charcoal and sulfur in the correct proportions (75% potassium nitrate:15% charcoal:10% sulfur) which has been ball-milled to mix it intimately. It is used in the same way as commercial meal powder or can be pressed and corned to produce true black powder.

Meal powder is made by mixing the ingredients by mass, rather than volume. These ingredients are processed in a ball mill, basically a rotating drum with non-sparking ceramic or lead balls. The more time spent in the mill, the more effective the powder will be. One main reason to ball mill as opposed to other methods is because it presses sulfur and KNO_{3} into the porous charcoal.
